= List of populated places in Gujrat District =

Map of Pakistan with Gujrat District highlighted

The following towns, villages, and other populated places are located within Gujrat District, Punjab, Pakistan. Where known, they are listed by tehsil; otherwise they are in alphabetical order.

== Chak jani kalanA ==
- Achh
- Addowal
- Ajnala
- Alamgarh
- Amra Kalan
- Awan Sharif
- Azam Nagar

== B ==
- Bagrianwala
- Bhagwal
- Baharwal
- Bajarwala
- Balobanian
- Bangial, Gujrat
- Bareela
- Barila Sharif
- Baroo
- Basrian
- Bator, Gujrat
- Beharaj
- Behilpur
- Behlolpur
- Beowali
- Bhaddar
- Bhago
- Bhagowal Kalan
- Bhagowal Khurd
- Bhakoki
- Bhalot Shera
- Bhand Gran
- Bharaj
- Bhurch
- Bido Bhatti

== C ==
- Chachian
- Chachian ranian
- Chak Bakhtawar
- Chak Bhola
- Chak Budho
- Chak Jani
- Chak Manju
- Chak Dina
- Chakfazal
- Chakori Bhalowal
- Chakori Khurd
- Chakori Sher Ghazi
- Chakrian
- Chechian
- Chhimber
- Chhokar Kalan
- Chiryawala Shareef
- Choa Rajgan
- Chopala

== D ==
- Deona
- Dera Alampur Gondlan
- Dhakkar
- Dhall Kakka
- Dhama
- Dhool Khurd
- Dhoria
- Dhunni
- Dinga
- Dittewal
- Dlawarpur
- Doga Sharif

== F-I ==
- Fateh Bhand
- Fatehpur
- Gakhar Chanan
- Gegian
- Geowanjal
- Ghuman
- Gilli Wala
- Gochh
- Goteriala
- Gujrat
- Guliana
- Gunja, Pakistan
- Hafiz Hayat
- Haji Chak
- Haji Muhammad
- Hajiwala
- Hakla
- Hardaspur
- Hayatgarh
- Ikhlasgarh
- Islam Garh
- Ismaila Shareef

== J-L ==
- Jagal
- Jalalpur Jattan
- Jand Sharif
- Jataria Khurd
- Jaura, Pakistan
- Jhamat Noabad
- Jhantla
- Kakrali
- Kala Chak
- Kala Kamala
- Kalra Khasa
- Kan Mohla
- Karianwala
- Karnana, Pakistan
- Khambi, Pakistan
- Kharana Pir Ghazi
- Kharian
- Kharian Cantonment
- Kheewa
- Khohar
- Khokhar
- Khori Alam
- Kot Ameer Hussain
- Kot Rahim Shah
- Kotha Gujjran
- Kotla Sarang Khan
- Kotli Kohala
- Kulachor
- Kunjah
- Kurree
- Lakhanwal
- Lalamusa
- Langay
- Langrial

== M-N ==
- Machiwaal
- Malka, Pakistan
- Malikpur, Gujrat
- Malowal
- Mandeer
- Mangowal Gharbi
- Mangowal Sharqi
- Marala
- Mari Khokhran
- Mari Waraichan
- Maroof
- Mehmand Chak
- Miana Chak
- Mirza Tahir, Punjab
- Mohla Khurd
- Mohri Sharif
- Moinuddinpur
- Mola Langrial
- Mumazpur
- Mund, Gujrat
- Nafrian
- Nandwal
- Naseera
- Noonanwali

== P-R ==
- Panjan Kissana
- Peroshah
- Pir Ghazi
- Pir Jand
- Punjwarian
- Qiladar
- Ranewal
- Rasool Pur

== S-T ==
- Saadat Pur
- Sahan Kalan
- Samrala Sharif
- Sarai Alamgir
- Sarai Alamgir Tehsil
- Saroki
- Sarsal
- Sehna
- Shadiwal
- Shahbazpur
- Shahjahanian
- Shahni Kotli
- Sheikh Pur
- Sidh, Gujrat
- Sikaryali
- Sook Kalan
- Sook Khurd
- Sullah
- Tanda
- Thatta Musa
- Thikrian
- Thimka
- Thutha Rai Bahadar
- Trerwanwala
- Wadapind

== Kharian Tehsil ==
Villages in Kharian Tehsil include:

- Basrian
- Bhagwal
- Ghurko
- Ladian
- Manglia
- Roulia
- Sadwal Kalan
- Sullah
