= Mund, Gujrat =

Mund
- Village
- Interactive map of Mund
- Coordinates: 32°32′43″N 74°00′50″E
- Country: Pakistan
- Province: Punjab
- District: Gujrat
- Tehsil: Gujrat

Population
  - Total: 10,000

Mund is a village (population 10,000) in Gujrat Tehsil, located in Gujrat District in Punjab, Pakistan.

Mund is located between the Upper Jhelum Canal (called Saroki Nehar) and Bhimber Nala, 7 km (4.35 mi.) west from Gujrat along Sargodha Road. The whole area of the village is 110182 m from north to south and 166894 m from east to west. There are a total of 1,000 houses in Mund, part of a housing initiative by the Pakistani government, called Jinnah Colony for journalists. The government also operates a model cattle farm there.

The village is fully furnished with modern utilities such as water, gas, electricity, telephone, cable, and internet, and is home to two middle schools, one for girls and one for boys. A primary school is also available for girls. Three mosques are situated in town for its Muslim majority population, 50% Shia and 50% Sunni. Two main festivals, called Uras Fateh Shah and Uras Shah Latif, are celebrated in the month of June and July every year. There are also three graveyards in Mund.

The main source of income in Mund is farming, as the land is very fertile for crops like wheat, rice and fodder. Some also work as laborers in factories which manufacture fans, while others live abroad.
