= Khambi =

Khambi may refer to the following villages:

- Khambi, Pakistan, in Punjab, Pakistan
- Khambi, Haryana, in India
- Khambi, Manipur, in India
