= Sarai Alamgir (disambiguation) =

Sarai Alamgir

- Sarai Alamgir - is the chief town of the tehsil of the Sarai Alamgir Tehsil in Pakistan
- Sarai Alamgir Tehsil is the tehsil in Pakistan
