= Saadat Pur =

Pakistani village

Saadat Pur Saatper
- Location in Pakistan
- Coordinates: 32°54′N 73°45′E
- Country: Pakistan
- Region: Punjab
- District: Gujrat
- Tehsil: Sarai Alamgir
- Union Council: Massom Pur
- Houses: 100
- Main Cast: Gujar

Government
  - Numberdar: Chaudhary Akmal

Population
  - Total: 1,000
- Time zone: UTC+5 (PST)

Saadat Pur (Urdu: ﺳﻌﺎﺩﺖ ﭘﻮﺮ) (pop. 1,000) is a village of Sarai Alamgir Tehsil. It is part of the Gujrat district in the north of the Punjab province in Pakistan. The village is located on the eastern bank of the Upper Jhelum Canal and lies along the road connecting Sarai Alamgir and Mirpur.

== Geography and climate ==
Saadat Pur lies at an altitude of 248 metres (814 ft) above sea level.

The village has a moderate climate. In the summer, temperatures can reach 45 °C (113 °F), but the hot spells are comparatively short. The winter months are very pleasant with temperatures rarely falling below 2 °C (36 °F)

== History ==
The region has participated in the Indus Valley Civilization and the Gandhara Civilization. Later, the Battle of the Hydaspes took place nearby, between the armies of Alexander the Great and the Indian king Porus.

The actual village of Saadat Pur was founded by Saadat Khan, who migrated to this place and inhabited the area. This place was chosen because of its ideal location on the Upper Jhelum canal and the road connecting Sarai Alamgir and Mirpur providing easy access to main markets.

Saadat Pur gained its prominence when the Upper Jhelum canal was created from Jhelum River; the village was then provided with bridge that linked villages situated on either sides of the new canal. It enabled nearby villages to also use the route. The village became hub of activities like the establishment of Saadat Pur Market (commonly known as PUL), Saadat Pur Post Office, branches of two leading commercial banks and a high school for boys.

== Castes living in Saadat Pur ==
The main caste of the village is Gujar. The history of different castes started when Saadat Khan, a Gujar by caste (and Khatana by sub caste) along with his family, came to the region and started using the land for agriculture. The newly settled family was threatened by Jats of a nearby village. To establish a strong community and Gujar dominance in the region, Khan invited another Gujar caste, Phambare, from a nearby region giving 50% of the land. Later, Khan invited a third Gujar caste, Chauhan, and offered him 50% of his remaining land.

Apart from the Gujar caste, different artisan castes were also allowed to live in the village and provide services to the Gujar clan. These included Masali, for labor work, Nayee, for hair cutting and cooking, Kasbi, for making cloths, Kumhaar, for making food utensils, and Mauchi, for making shoes.

== Transport ==
The nearest international airport is at Rawalpindi, about 143 km (89 mi) away. A two-lane road connects the village to Sarai Alamgir, where passengers can use railway transport and the Grand Trunk Road. The same road leads to Mirpur in the opposite direction, providing connections to different cities of Azad Kashmir.

== Sites of interest ==
The town lies between the town of Sarai Alamgir and Mirpur. Nearby are the sites of the Jagu Head, Mangla Dam, River Jhelum, and the Rohtas Fort.
