= Malowal =

Pakistani Punjab's District Gujrat's Prominent Village With Diverse Casts

Coordinates: 32°44′29.33″N 74°16′21.05″E

Mallowal (مالووال) is comparatively prominent village of Gujrat Tehsil, situated in northeast of Pakistan, it is one among seven villages of in union council Karianwala in Gujrat District.

Mallowal (مالووال) is a village in Gujrat Tehsil of Gujrat District, Punjab, Pakistan. It is one of the villages within Union Council Karianwala.

The village has a predominantly Gujjar population. According to local tradition, Mallowal derives its name from Baba Mallow, who is regarded locally as an early settler or founder of the village. The village has separate government primary schools for boys and girls.
