= Jhamat Noabad =

Jhamat Noabad جھمٹ نو آباد
- Location within Punjab, Pakistan Location within Pakistan
- Country: Pakistan
- Province: Punjab
- District: Gujrat

Population
  - Total: 900
- Time zone: UTC+5 (PST)
- Calling code: 053

Jhamat Noabad (Urdu: جھمٹ نو آباد) is a village in Gujrat District, of the Punjab province, Pakistan. Jhamat is situated near the village Kotli Kohala.
