= Dhool Khurd =

Coordinates: 32°35′50″N 74°01′50″E

Dhool Khurd (دھول خورد)/du:l hɔ:rd/
- Village
- Interactive map of Dhool Khurd (دھول خورد)/du:l hɔ:rd/
- Country: Pakistan
- Province: Punjab
- Division: Gujrat
- District: Gujrat
- Tehsil: Gujrat

Government
- Time zone: UTC+5 (PST)

Dhool Khurd (دھول خورد) /du:l hɔ:rd/) is a village located in Gujrat District in the Punjab province of Pakistan. It is situated approximately 6 km northeast of Gujrat city along the Dinga-Gujrat road. It lies near the Bhimber creek, only a kilometer from the Lahore-Islamabad G.T. Road. The nomenclature of the village is derived from the Dhool clan of Jatts, who are the founders of the village and coexist with various other clans, namely Jatt Aaran, Jatt Khokhar, Jatt Virk, Jatt Gondal, and a substantial number of non-agriculturalists.

Dhool Khurd is an integral part of the Adowal union council and boasts a robust political history. Many individuals from this village have established themselves abroad, residing in countries like Saudi Arabia, UAE, UK, Europe, Canada, and Australia. They are engaged in diverse fields, including trade, construction, transport, real estate, and engineering. Notably, the village holds the distinction of having the highest count of employees working for the Water and Power Development Authority.

The literacy rate in Dhool Khurd surpasses that of neighboring villages, and the population comprises around 4000 people in over 300 families.

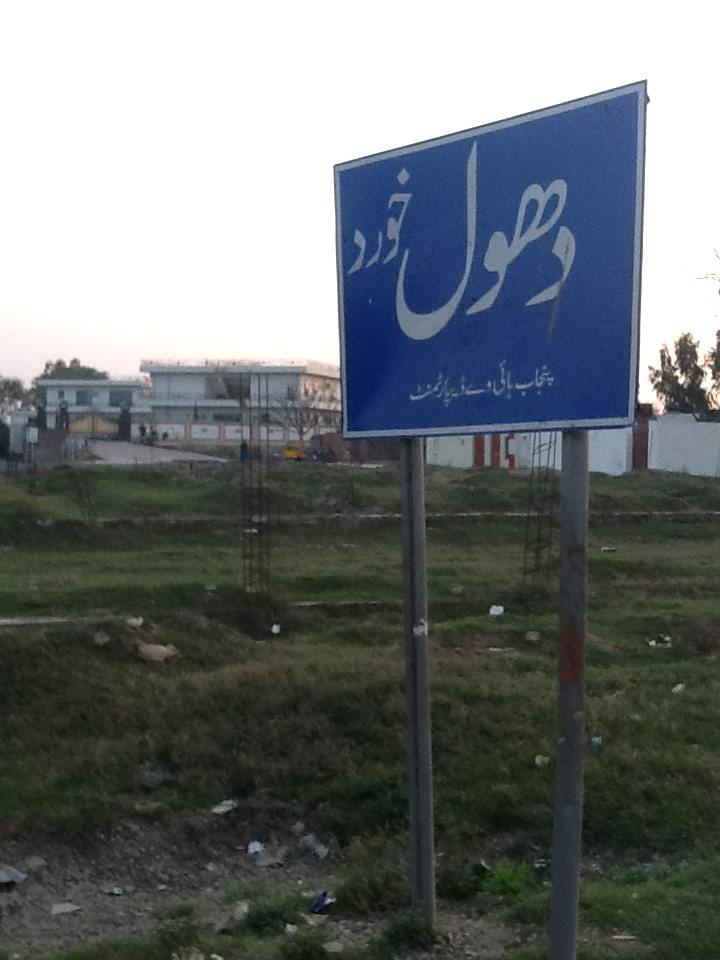
Dhool Khurd board

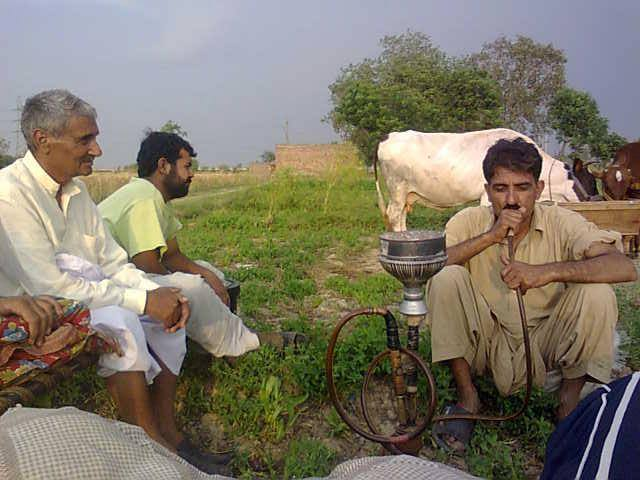
Residents of Dhool Khurd

== Aerial views of Dhool Khurd ==
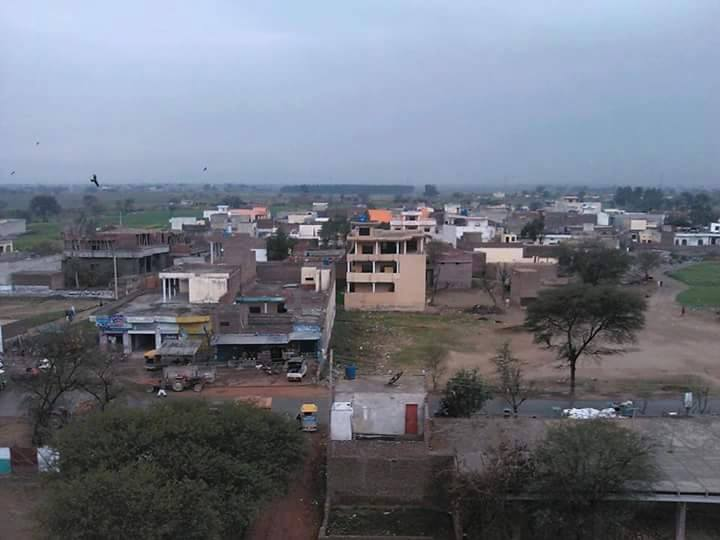
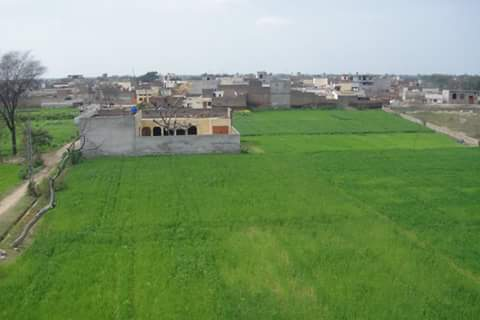

== Neighbouring villages ==
- Rahmania
- Dheru Ghuna
- Sahanwal
- Shahabdiwal
- Changanwali
- Wains

== Schools ==
Government Boys Primary School Dhool Khurd

Government Girls Primary School Dhool Khurd

Government Girls High School Dhool Khurd
