= Khohar =

Village in Pakistan

Coordinates: 32.807512°N 73.646314°E

Khokhar is a village of District Gujrat, in the Punjab province, Pakistan. The village population is mostly Muslim. There are almost 30 mosques in Khokhar, including five Jamia mosques (mosque where Friday prayer can be offered ). Khokhar is almost 17 kilometres (11 miles) south of the town of Sarai Alamgir. Upper Jhelum Canal flows to its east while the River Jhelum borders it to the west. Khokhar is divided into various "Mohalla" and "Dhoke", e.g. Dhoke Baba Hafiz Jee, Dhoke Shamali, Dhoke Baba Hussain Shah, Mohllah Maki Masjid, Mohallah Malkana, Mohallah Hajiaetc. Khokhar is divided into two main parts: Khokhar Khurad and Khokhar Kalan.

== Education ==
Khokhar has many public and private schools. Government Higher Secondary School Khohar has produced many doctors, engineers, lawyers, public servant and army officers. The main educational institutions in the village include:

- Government Higher Secondary School Khohar

Details; This institute was established in 1800s. Upgraded as higher secondary school in 1988.now student strength is increasing rapidly.

- Government Higher Secondary School for Girls. (result 70% 2015)
- Government Primary School for Boys. (result 20% 2015 still all fifth graders promoted)
- Government Primary School for Girls. (result 23% 2015 still all fifth graders promoted)
- New Vision High School Khohar(result 10% 2015)
- Zia Public School Khokhar. (result 40%)
- Rehman Public School Khokhar. (result 50% 2015)
- Sulman Academy

Only 25% of total population is educated to 12th grade, a few go for bachelor's degree. Only few personnel attained Commission in Pakistan Army.

== Notable people ==
Being the largest village in the District of Gujrat, Khokhar has produced numerous notable personalities who have contributed towards the betterment of the region, its people and the country. Some of these notable personalities of Khokhar include Malik Hanif Awan, MALIK MATLOOB HUSSAIN AWAN, HAJI THAYKAYDAR MALIK IQBAL AWAN(president all Pakistan anjamantajran), Malik besharat awan , Malik Subedar Rab Nawaz, Malik Khurshid Sultan, Malik Amjad Sadiq and Malik Asim, Owners of Top Topic 101 Another is the notable Lt Col.Liaqat Ali Malik (retd.) who is the first person of Khokhar to have studied from within the village itself and attain a high rank in the Pakistan Army.
