= Beharaj =

- Interactive map of Beharaj
- Coordinates: 32.40°N 74.14°E
- Country: Pakistan
- Province: Punjab
- District: Gujrat
- Tehsil: Gujrat
- Time zone: UTC+5 (PST)

Beharaj is a town and union council of Gujrat District, in the Punjab province of Pakistan.
