= Mumazpur =

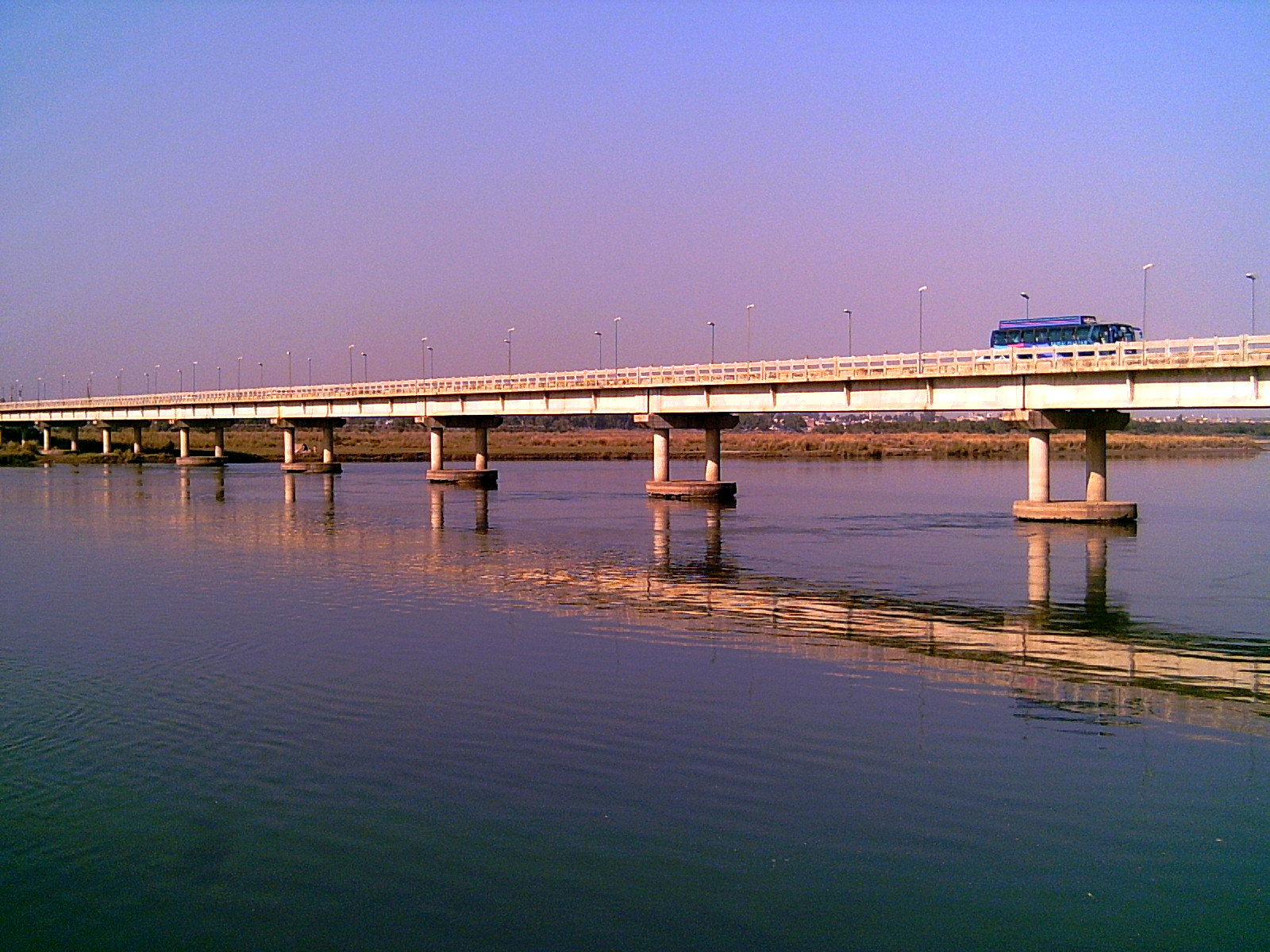
- The River Jhelum and the bridge from Sarai Alamgir side

- Location in Pakistan
- Country: Pakistan
- Province: Punjab
- District: Gujrat

- Village
- Mumazpur
- Location within Pakistan
- Coordinates: 32.946973°N 73.819316°E
- Country: Pakistan
- Province: Punjab
- Time zone: UTC+5 (PST)

Mumazpur is a village of Sarai Alamgir, in Gujrat District, of the Punjab province, Pakistan. The village is situated on GT Road, about 10 km from the main Sarai Alamgir city.

== Language ==
As per the 1998 census, Punjabi is the main language of Sarai Alamgir spoken by 94% population. Urdu, the national language, is spoken widely while English spoken by educated elite.

== Facilities ==
- Religious Educational Institutions (One Islamic School)
- Private Schools " Al Bilal Academy"

== Castes ==
- Arain
- Pathan
- Raja
- Mirza
- Cobbler

== Religion ==
- Islam almost 100% followers
- Four Mosques

== Agriculture ==
Mostly peoples having agriculture business here which are the bone of the economy.

=== Main Crops ===
- Wheat
- Corn
- Rice
- Sugarcane
- Vegetables: turnip, carrot, broad beans, eggplant, tomato, cucumber, onion, garlic, red chili, potato, Momordica charantia, pumpkin, white radish and spinach
- Fruit: mangoes, oranges, guava, watermelon, lemons and strawberries
