= Chaupal =

Chaupal or Chopal can refer to:

- Chaupal (public space), a community building or space in the rural areas of North India and Pakistan
- Litter (vehicle) or chaupal, a human-powered vehicle, palanquin
- Chaupal (caste), a Hindu caste
- Chaupal (streaming service), an Indian streaming service
- Chaupal, Himachal Pradesh, a town in Himachal Pradesh, India
  - Chopal Assembly constituency, in the Himachal Pradesh Legislative Assembly
- Chaupal TV, a Punjabi-language TV channel in Pakistan

== See also ==
- Chopala, a town in Gujrat District of Punjab, Pakistan
- Choupal National Forest, Coimbra, Portugal
- Kameshwar Choupal (1956–2025), an Indian politician
