= Nafrian =

Coordinates: 32°40′27.4″N 74°12′03″E

Naferian نافریا
- Interactive map of Naferian
- Country: Pakistan
- Province: Punjab
- District: Gujrat
- Time zone: UTC+5 (PST)
- Calling code: 053

Nafrian (Urdu: نفریاں) is a village situated near Thimka in Gujrat District, in Punjab, Pakistan.
