= Malikpur, Gujrat =

Village in Gujrat District, Punjab, Pakistan

Malikpur
- Village
- Location in Pakistan
- Coordinates: 32°38′40″N 74°02′49″E
- Country: Pakistan
- Province: Punjab
- District: Gujrat
- Tehsil: Gujrat
- Elevation: 225 m (738 ft)

Population (2017 Census of Pakistan)
  - Total: 1,977
- Time zone: UTC+5 (PST)
- Postal code: 50700
- Area code: 0533

Malikpur (also known as Malikpur Chahra) is a village in Gujrat District, Punjab, Pakistan.

It is situated about 9.2 kilometres (5.7 mi) north from the main city of Gujrat. It is surrounded on the East by Jora and Jalalpur, and on the West by Chahra and Tibba Bootay Shah.

A unique feature of Malikpur is that it is surrounded by water-drainage canals called naalas or choyees on both the East and the West ends of the village that come together to form the Dhamel at the South end of the village. Historically, Malikpur has been divided into two main parts: Eastern Muhalla (Charday Aala Muhalla) and Western Muhalla (Lehnday Aala Muhalla).

The majority of the people of Malikpur are Malik (Talli) , Malik Awan , Gujjars, but people from other clans such as Syeds and Butts also reside here. There is also a significant population of people from the worker/skilled class (eg Mochi, Kumhaar, Masali, Maachi…etc) that are spread throughout the village. Historically, there have been two main families within the Gujjar clan in Malikpur: Khatanas & Chaudhrys(sub caste Gujjar Khatanas). According to the Revenue Record village is of Gujjar Khatanas.

Malikpur has traditionally fallen under the Union Council (UC) of Deona, but over time, it has switched between either UC Deona or UC Sabowal. Prior to 1996, Malikpur was part of UC Deona, but after 1996, it was switched to UC Sabowal. Similarly, in 1999 it became part of UC Deona but in the 2015 local government elections, it was again made part of UC Sabowal.
