= Khokhar, Mirpur =

Village in Gujrat District, Punjab, Pakistan

Coordinates: 32.6445°N 74.071°E

Khokhar is a village located in the Gujrat Tehsil of the Gujrat District, Punjab, Pakistan, approximately 5 miles north of the city of Gujrat.

== History ==
The village gets its name from the Khokhar tribe, who make up the bulk of the population. A famous tomb of Baba Jhanghu Shah is located in Khokhar.

== Demographics ==
According to the 1998 census of Pakistan, the village population was 2,351.
