= Piro Shah =

Peroshah پیرو شاہ
- Village
- Interactive map of Peroshah
- Coordinates: 32°43′25″N 74°09′27″E
- Country: Pakistan
- Province: Punjab
- Division: Gujrat
- District: Gujrat
- Tehsil: Gujrat

Government
- Time zone: UTC+5 (PST)
- Calling code: 053

Peroshah or Pero Shah (Urdu: پیرو شاہ) is a village and union council in Gujrat District, Pakistan, about 22 kilometres (14 mi) from the district headquarters of Gujrat.

There is a government high school in the village.
