= Sadwal Kalan =

Village in Punjab, Pakistan

Sadwal Kalan سدوال کلاں
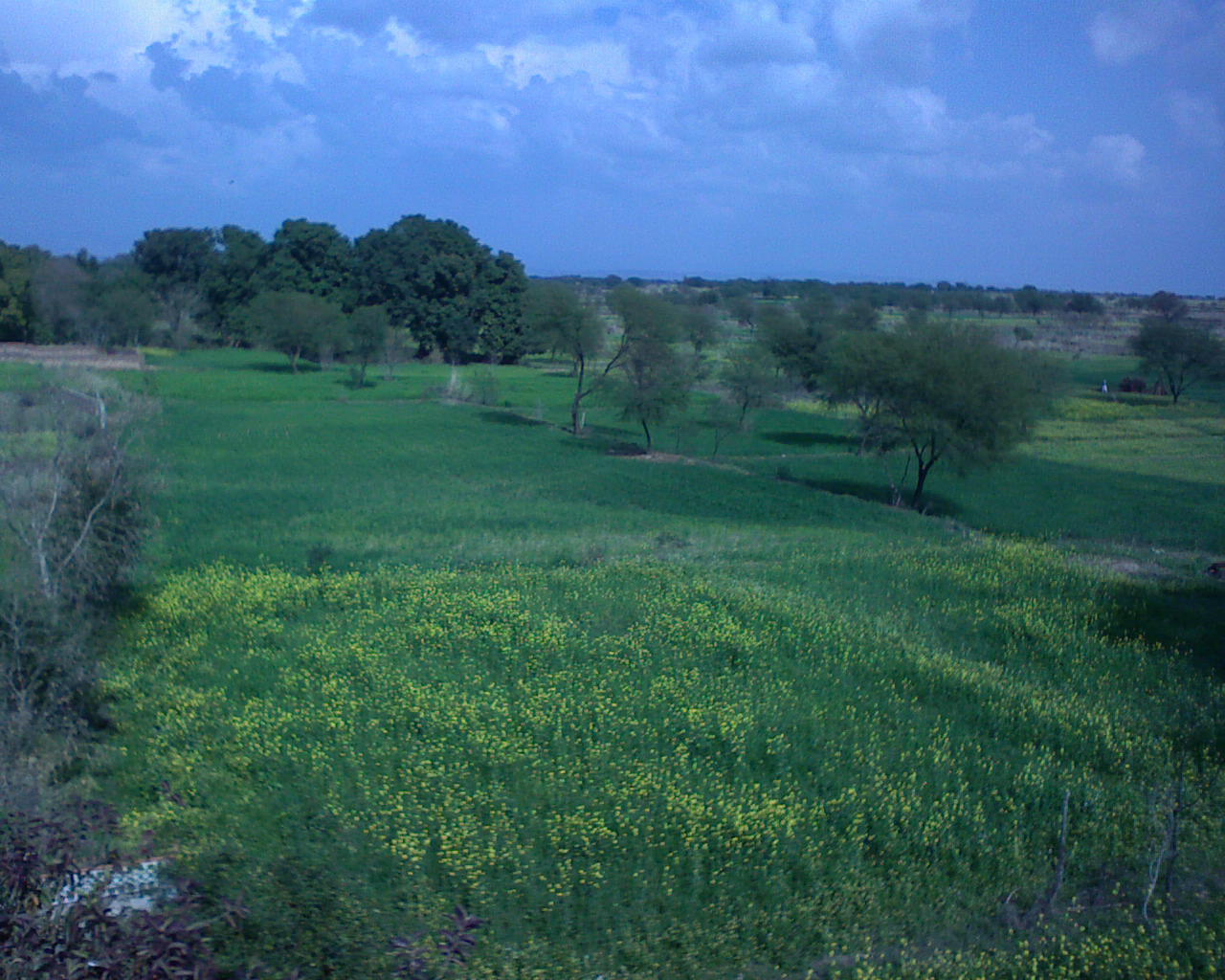
- Countryside around Sadwal Kalan
- Interactive map of Sadwal Kalan
- Coordinates: 32°50′30.69″N 74°06′29.81″E
- Country: Pakistan
- Province: Punjab
- Region/Division: Gujrat
- District: Gujrat
- Tehsil: Kharian

Government
- Time zone: UTC+5 (PST)
- Postal Code: 50991
- Area code: 053

Sadwal Kalan is a village in the Gujrat District of Punjab, Pakistan. It is situated approximately 3 kilometres east of Kotla, 35 kilometres from Gujrat, and about 25 kilometres from Kharian Tehsil. The village falls under the jurisdiction of Union Council Kakrali, which is just 4 kilometres to the north, with the border of Azad Kashmir lying roughly 10 kilometres further north. The majority of Sadwal Kalan's population are Jatt/Chaudharies, Muslim, contributing to its distinct cultural identity. A large portion of Sadwal Kalan's population lives abroad, contributing to the village's development and supporting their families through remittances.

== Gallery ==
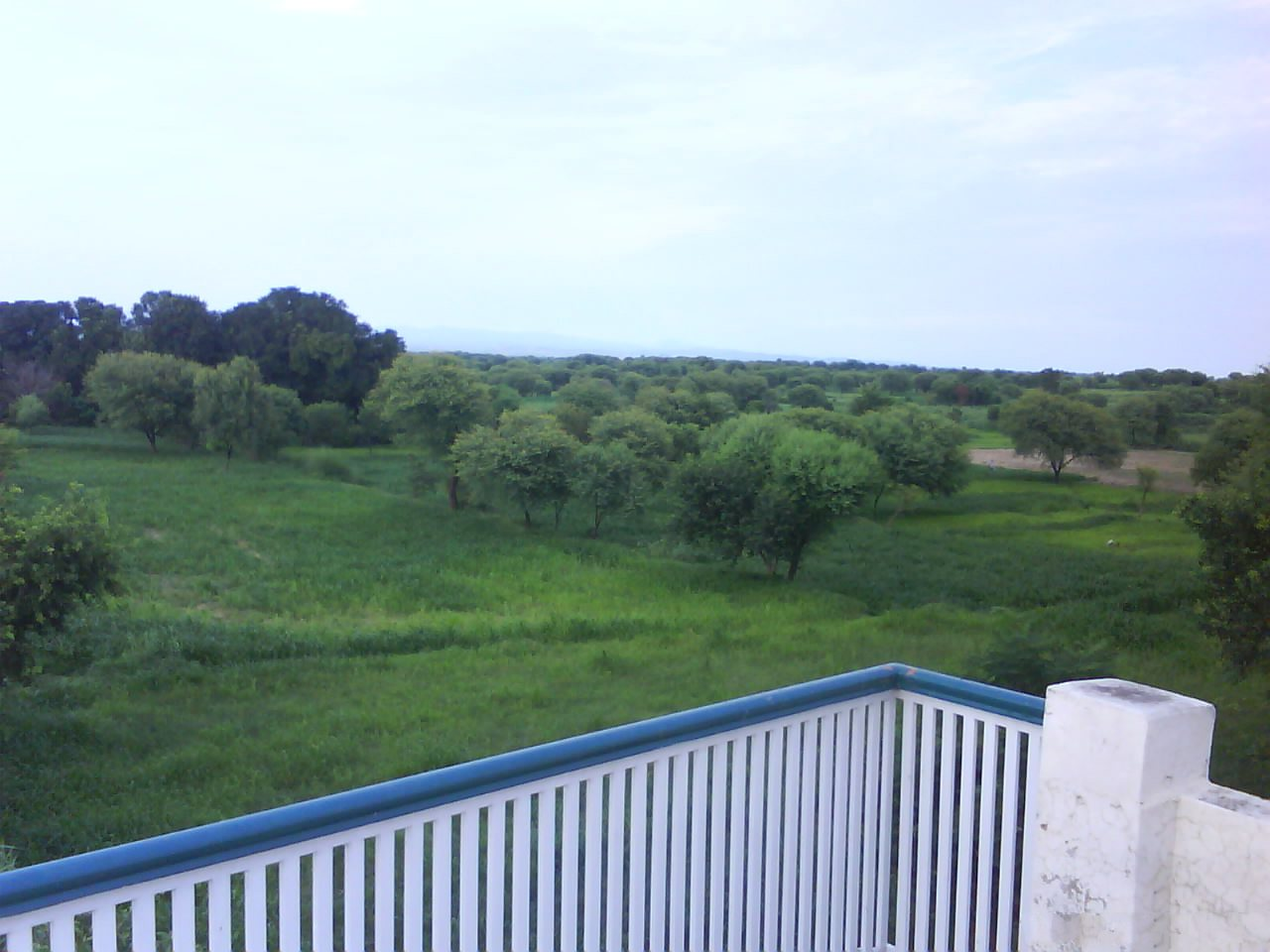
Crops of Bajra

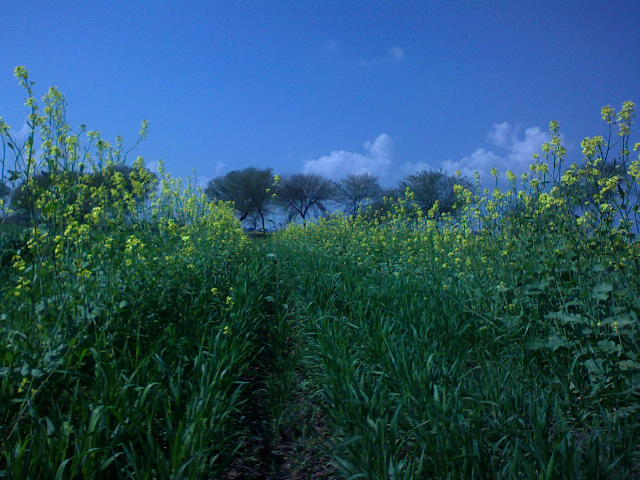
Nice View of Flowers of Mustard(Sarsoon)

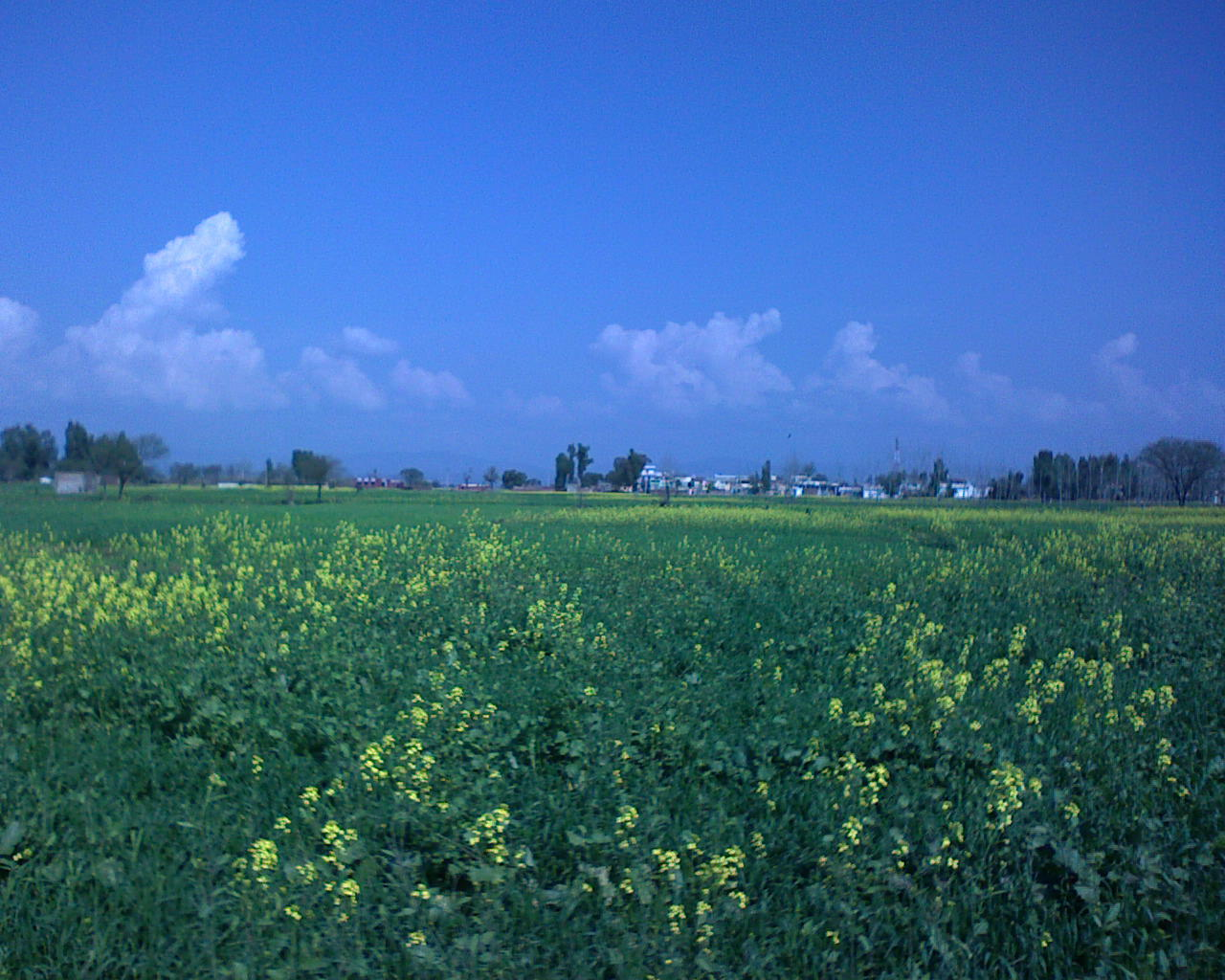
Flowers of Mustard in Kaalian

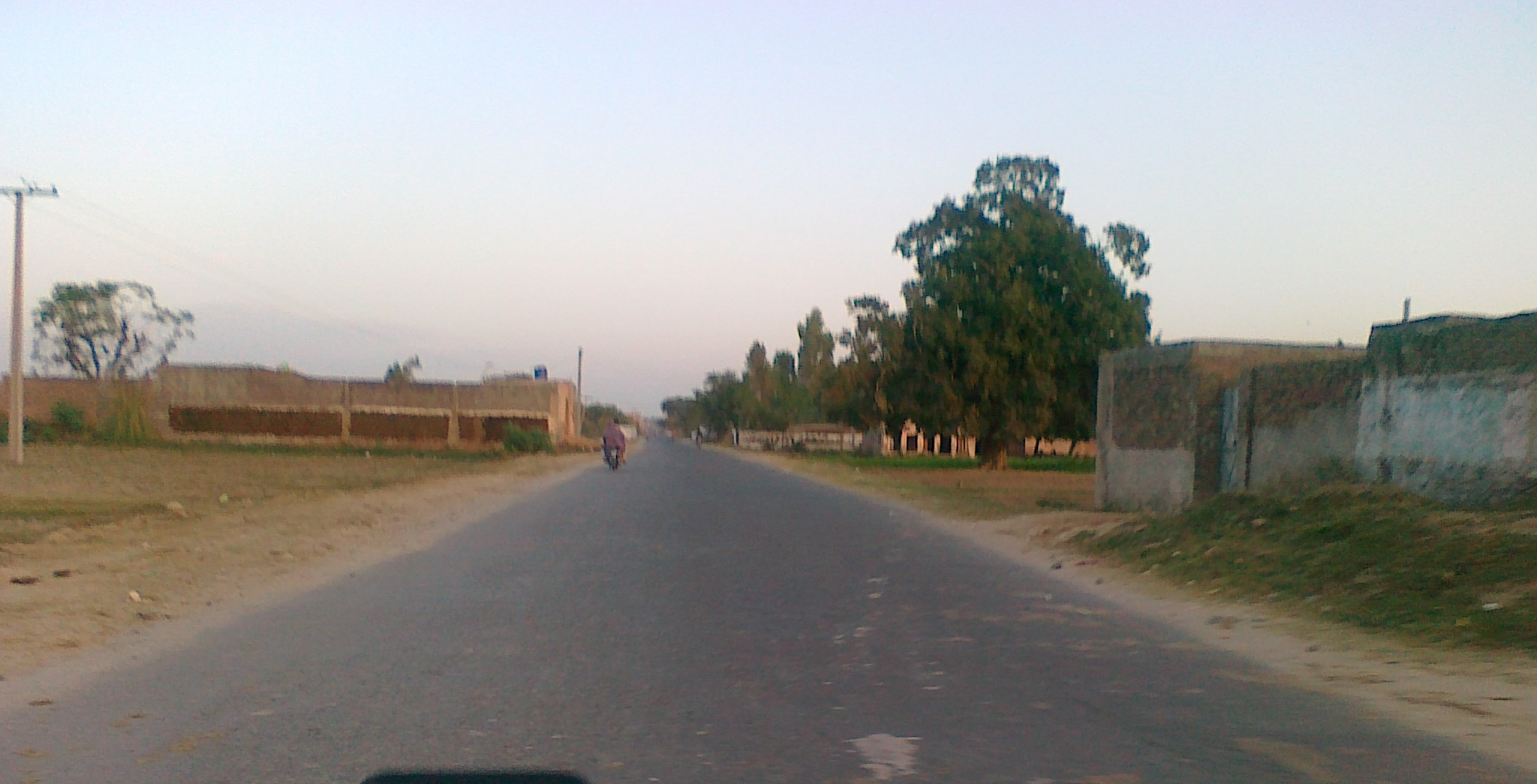
Sadwal Road New

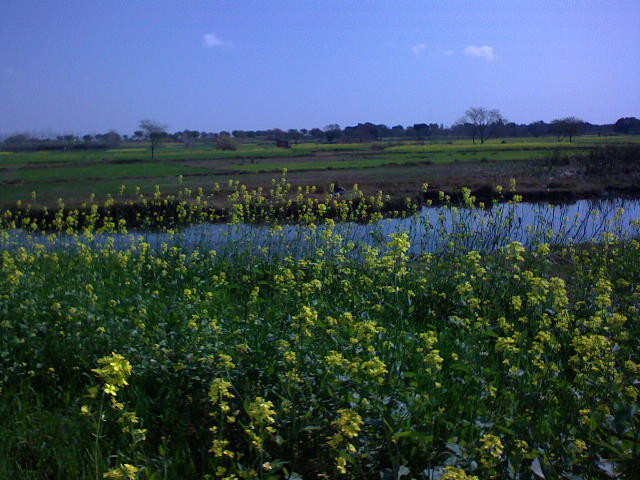
A view of Mustard Flower Near Daali

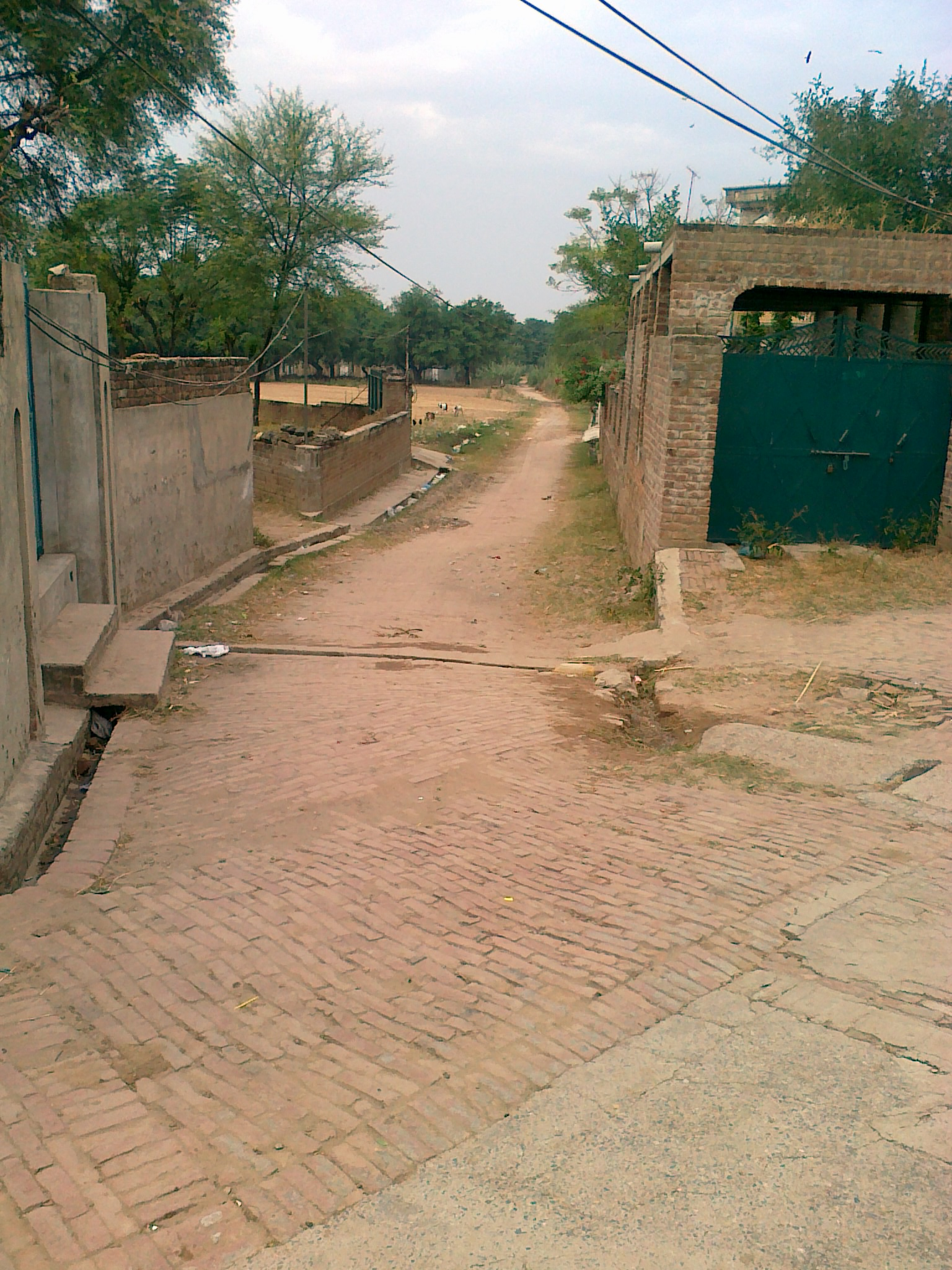
Street Towards Pindi

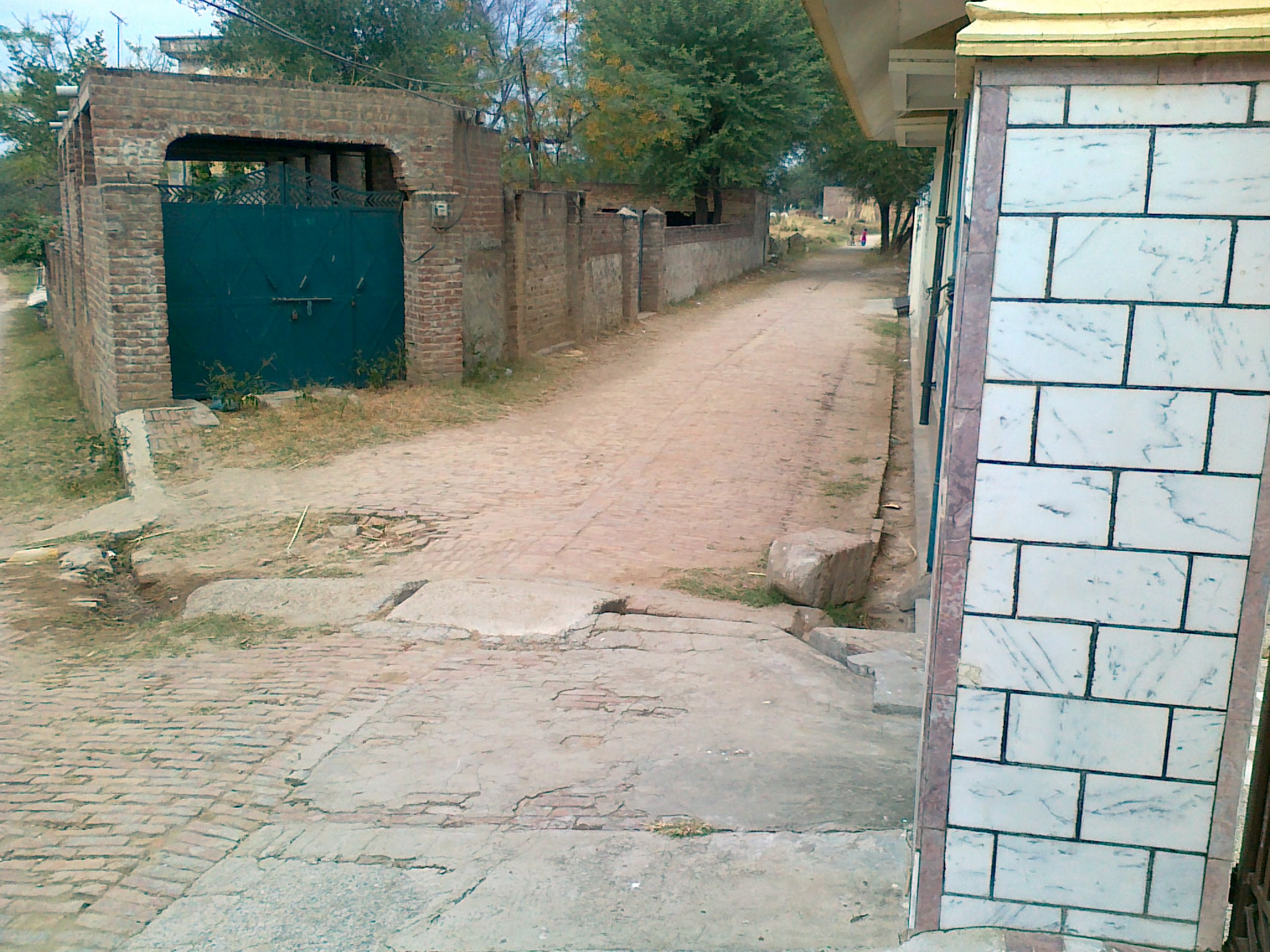
Street Towards Pindi Awan

== Neighbour villages ==
- Kakrali
- Kotla Arab Ali Khan
- Langrial
- Sahan Kalan
