= Bido Bhatti =

Coordinates: 32°42′N 74°24′E

- Town and union council
- Interactive map of Bido Bhatti
- Country: Pakistan
- Province: Punjab
- District: Gujrat
- Tehsil: Gujrat
- Time zone: UTC+5 (PST)

Bido Bhatti is a small village near the town of Tanda, in Gujrat District in Punjab province of Pakistan.

It is about 35 km northeast of Gujrat city and about 25 km from the city of Sialkot.
