= Bharaj =

Coordinates: 32°40′49.3″N 74°14′10.8″E

Bharaj بھراج
- Interactive map of Bharaj
- Country: Pakistan
- Province: Punjab
- District: Gujrat
- Time zone: UTC+5 (PST)
- Calling code: 053

Bharaj (Urdu: بھراج) is a village situated near Mangowal Sharqi in Gujrat District, Punjab, Pakistan. It is on Karianwala Road approximately 15 km (9.3 mi) from the city of Gujrat. Bharaj is an old village and is inhabited by the Gujjar caste. It has an ancient grave of "Baba Naala ( Nihal Chand)" who is believed to be the elder of all the Gujjars settled in the district. In Gujarat, there is another village named Bharaj as well.
