= Haji Muhammad =

Coordinates: 32°38′26.711″N 73°54′15.408″E

- Town and union council
- Interactive map of Haji Muhammad
- Country: Pakistan
- Province: Punjab
- District: Gujrat
- Tehsil: Kharian
- Time zone: UTC+5 (PST)

Haji Muhammad (Urdu: حاجی محمد) is a town and union council of Gujrat District, in the Punjab province of Pakistan. It is part of Kharian Tehsil and is located at 32°38'20N 73°54'20E with an altitude of 246 metres (810 feet). Union Council Haji Muhammad has a further 11 villages, including; Haji Muhammad, Gajju, Bhalot Rasoo, Bhalot Makhdoom, Bhalot Shera, Paul, Pohla, Tibbi Chand, Chokar Kalan, Spra, Dullanwala and Hera Pur.
