= Sook Kalan =

Coordinates: 32°35′48″N 74°08′40″E

Sooke سوک کلاں
- Village
- Sook Kalan
- Interactive map of Sooke
- Country: Pakistan
- Province: Punjab
- District: Gujrat

Population
  - Estimate (2017): 20,000
- Time zone: UTC+5 (PST)
- Calling code: 053

Sook Kalan (Urdu: سوک کلاں; Punjabi: سوکے) is a village in Gujrat District, Pakistan. It is located near the Beowali village and about 5 kilometers north of Gujrat city.
