= Barila Sharif =

Village in Punjab, Pakistan

Bareela بڑیلہ
- Town and union council

- Location in Pakistan
- Coordinates: 32°45′0″N 74°24′0″E
- Country: Pakistan
- Province: Punjab
- Division: Gujrat
- District: Gujrat
- Tehsil: Gujrat
- Time zone: UTC+5 (PST)

Barilla Sharif (بڑیلہ شریف) is a village in Gujrat District, Punjab, Pakistan. It is situated in the northeastern part of the district, near the India-Pakistan border and the Jammu and Kashmir region.

The village is located at approximately 32°45'0N 74°24'0E with an altitude of 273 metres (898 feet). It is approximately 38 km from Gujrat City and 24 kilometers from Jalalpur Jattan.

== Religious sites ==
=== Grave ===
An unusual grave was discovered in 1902. Local tradition identifies it as the grave of Qanbeet, a figure described in some accounts as a son of Adam. The grave is enclosed within a large hall and marked with white marble. The surrounding graveyard is known as Peer Sachyar, though the origin of this name is uncertain. A small mosque was constructed near the grave by the Pakistan Army in 1971, and the names of soldiers (Shuhada) are inscribed on one of its walls.

The religious grave site in Barilla Sharif.

=== Khanqah of Khwaja Maulvi Muhammad Hafeez Ullah Chishti Qadri ===
A photo of Khwaja Maulvi Muhammad Hafeez Ullah Chishti Qadri

Bareela Sharif is home to a Sufi khanqah, locally referred to as a dera, associated with Khwaja Maulvi Muhammad Hafeez Ullah Chishti Qadri. The institution serves as a center for religious gatherings, spiritual guidance, and community assistance, including the provision of langar (free communal meals). According to local accounts, the village, formerly known as Barila, became known as Barilla Sharif through its association with him. The khanqah attracted visitors and followers from different regions of Pakistan and abroad.

Khwaja Hafeez Ullah established a system of hospitality and community assistance at the khanqah, providing visitors with meals, tea, a designated prayer space, and temporary accommodation when needed. The khanqah also served as a gathering place where visitors could discuss personal concerns and seek religious guidance and prayers.

A photo of Khwaja Maulvi Muhammad Hafeez Ullah Chishti Qadri

Following his death, his son succeeded him as a Sufi religious leader and played a central role in expanding the khanqah's charitable activities. He developed the agricultural system associated with the institution, establishing a more extensive and sustained langar (free communal kitchen) through which meals were provided to visitors and people in need. Alongside these activities, he continued to offer religious guidance, counsel, and prayers to followers.

The site of Khwaja Hafeezullah's Kanqah

In subsequent generations, members of the family, including Khwaja Hafeez Ullah's daughter-in-law and granddaughter, became locally known for providing homeopathic treatments, particularly to women and children.

The khanqah and its community services have continued through successive generations of the family. According to family accounts, its current administration includes Khwaja Hafeez Ullah's granddaughter, grandson, and great-grandson.

== Economy ==
Historically villager's main occupation has been agriculture. The village has separate high schools for boys and girls. Some private schools are available.

== Health care ==
The village has a primary health care facility.

== History ==
The aristocracy was broken during WWII and Second Industrial Revolution when agriculture decline and urbanization started.
