= Sullah, Gujrat =

Village in Punjab, Pakistan

Sullah is a village in Kharian Tehsil, Gujrat District, in the Punjab province of Pakistan. The village is approximately 12 km from Kotla Arab Ali Khan and 3 km from Awan Sharif. Azad Kashmir is to the east of the village.
