= Chak Manju =

Town and union council in Pakistan's Gujarat District

Coordinates: 32°36′55″N 74°8′55″E

- Town and union council
- Interactive map of Chak Manju
- Country: Pakistan
- Province: Punjab
- District: Gujrat
- Tehsil: Gujrat
- Time zone: UTC+5 (PST)

Chak Manju is a town and union council of the Gujrat District, in the Punjab province of Pakistan. The altitude is 227 metres (745 ft). The Pakistan Muslim League (Q), Pakistan Muslim League (N), and Pakistan Tehreek-e-Insaf are among the most popular political parties in the area.
