= Karianwala =

Town in Punjab, Pakistan

Karianwala کڑیانوالہ
- Location within Punjab, Pakistan
- Coordinates: 32°45′05″N 74°16′44″E
- Country: Pakistan
- Province: Punjab
- District: Gujrat

Government
  - Village Chairman: Asif Zafar Jatt
- Time zone: UTC+1 (PST)

Karianwala (Urdu: کڑیانوالہ) is a town of Gujrat Tehsil, in Gujrat District, in the Punjab province, Pakistan. It is situated near Jalalpur Jattan. The people of Karianwala belong to different castes like Mughal, Gujjar, Jatt, Butt, Bhatti, Arain, Tarkhan, Mochi, Wariahs, Shiekhs, Machis, Jogis and other related castes. It is basically an old town that consists of many old buildings and houses.The economy of the town mainly depends upon the business as it is known as biggest market in the surrounding villages like Mallowal, Chalay Shref, Bhangranwala, Majra Peroshah, Hajiwala, Santal, Kot Jeml, Barnala and Tanda, however, as the literacy rate is in rising trend, people are joining other professions as well like the army, police, Banking, educational departments, medicine, etc. Moreover, most of the people of this town love to go abroad currently, there are many people living and working in other developed countries. Most of the people are living in Spain, Italy, England, Greece, France, Norway, Saudi Arabia and UAE etc. people are living very progressive life and its very hard to find a maid in this town. Documents in local archives indicate that it was founded in 1206–1207. It was the site of a battle in 1780 CE.

According to one proposal, the name "Karianwala" is derived from the Punjabi/Urdu word "Kari", meaning chain", in reference to historical steel chain production in the area. The town has experiences development, featuring nine bank branches, a government degree college for boys, and a government hospital equipped with modern technology and staffed by professional medical personnel.

== History ==
The precise origin of Karianwala has been a mystery for the local historians; however, there is evidence that a town settlement was built in the years AD 1206–1207, by a slave known as Saiy Satwan, at the direction of Qutbuddin Aibak, a king of northwest India, who was the first Sultan of Delhi and founder of the Ghulam dynasty (Mamluk Sultanate) of India. During the reign of Akbar, Masami Mahbu settled a base under the name "Akbarabad". Later, the descendants of Masami inhabited Karianwala, and they built other towns in the surrounding area.

A fort, known as Islamgarh Fort, had been constructed at Islamgarh, near to Karianwala. During 1828, Mahaja Ranjit Singh built a mint in the area.

== Climate ==
This city has moderate climate, which is hot in summer and cold in winter. During peak summer, the day temperature shoots up to 50 °C,

== Education ==
There are two specialised government colleges in the city.

The population of the city began to grow quickly at some point in the past century, increasing need for Elementary, Middle, and High Schools. As the government did not (and does not) have a lot of resources to keep up with the demand, some private schools were built along with state schools. Notable schools in the area are 'Al Suffah Model School' 'The Educators' 'Jinnah Public School' and 'Danish International Grammar School & Girls College'.
