= Chak Jani =

Jani Chak چک جانی
- Village and union council
- Chak Jani Kalan
- Interactive map of Jani Chak
- Coordinates: 32°36′0″N 73°51′0″E
- Country: Pakistan
- Region: Punjab
- Division: Gujrat
- District: Gujrat
- Tehsil: Kharian

Population
  - Total: 10,000
  - Density: 2,000/km^{2} (5,200/sq mi)
- Time zone: UTC+5 (PST)
- Postal code: 50281
- Area code: 50281

Chak Jani is a town and union council of Gujrat District, in the Punjab province of Pakistan. It is part of Kharian Tehsil and is located at 32°36'0N 73°51'0E at an altitude of 222 metres (731 feet).
