= Fateh Bhand =

Coordinates: 32°42′0″N 73°43′0″E

Fatta Bhand فتہ بھنڈ
- Town and union council
- Interactive map of Fatta Bhand
- Country: Pakistan
- Region: Punjab
- Division: Gujrat
- District: Gujrat
- Tehsil: Kharian
- Police Station: Dinga
- Time zone: UTC+5 (PST)

Fatta Bhand is a town and union council of Gujrat District, in the Punjab province of Pakistan. It is part of Kharian Tehsil and located at 32°42'0N 73°43'0E at an altitude of 227 metres (748 feet). In the 2013 general elections, Member of National Assembly (MNA) for NA-106 (Gujrat) was elected from this village first time after Independence 1947, He is Chaudhry Jaffar Iqbal.
