= Mari Waraichan =

Mari Warraichan ماڑی وڑائچاں ماڑی وڑائچاں
- Village
- Interactive map of Mari Warraichan ماڑی وڑائچاں
- Location within Pakistan
- Coordinates: 32°38′37″N 74°17′55″E
- Pakistan: Pakistan
- Province: Punjab
- Division: Gujrat
- District: Gujrat

Government
  - Chairman: Khawar Saeed

Population
  - Estimate: 5,000
- Time zone: UTC+5 (PST)
- Calling code: 053

Mari Waraichan is a village in the Punjab province of Pakistan. It is located in Gujrat District at 32 38' 37" north and 74 17' 55" east, near the bank of the river Chenab. Most of the population there are Jats. Most of the population earn their livelihood by land farming and dairy farming.
