= Mirza Tahir, Gujrat =

Noonawali
- village
- Noonawali
- Location in Pakistan
- Coordinates: 32°44′18″N 73°46′49″E
- Country: Pakistan
- Province: Punjab
- District: Gujrat
- Tehsil: Kharian
- Elevation: 244 m (801 ft)
- Time zone: UTC+5 (PST)

Noonawali is a village and Union Council of Gujrat District, in the Punjab province of Pakistan. It is part of Kharian Tehsil. It is the second richest village in Tehsil Kharian after Karianwala. The main source of livelihood of the population is agriculture but most families have relatives living abroad and the remittance they send prop up the local economy.

== Demographics ==
Population of the village is 4000; ratio of the male and female is 40% and 60%. Noonawali having a high school-Govt High school Noonawali and a Girls elementary high school. A poorly equipped medical centre is also there that provides basic health facilities to general public.
