= Shahbazpur (village) =

Coordinates: 32°36′55.7″N 74°16′7.7″E

Shahbazpur شہباز پور
- Interactive map of Shahbazpur
- Country: Pakistan
- Province: Punjab
- District: Gujrat
- Time zone: UTC+5 (PST)
- Calling code: 053

Shahbazpur (Urdu: شہباز پور) is a village in Gujrat District, Pakistan. The Chenab passes along the eastern boundary of the village.
