= Sikaryali =

Pakistani village

Coordinates: 32°37′0″N 73°49′0″E

Sikaryali سیکریالی
- Town and union council
- Interactive map of Sikaryali
- Country: Pakistan
- Province: Punjab
- District: Gujrat
- Tehsil: Kharian

Government
  - Choudhary Salam Hussain: Choudhary Ismaeel Haider mehr
- Elevation: 223 m (732 ft)

Population
  - Total: 15,000
- Time zone: UTC+5 (PST)
- Postal code: 50260
- Area code: 053
- Website: https://www.facebook.com/sikeryali.pk

Sikaryali (سیکریالی) is a town and union council in Gujrat District, of the Punjab province, Pakistan, in Kharian Tehsil, at 32°37'0"N and 73°49'0"E, with an elevation of 223 meters (734 feet).
