= Thatta Musa =

Village in Punjab, Pakistan

- Village
- Location within Pakistan
- Coordinates: 32°36′39.7″N 74°14′24.2″E
- Country: Pakistan
- Province: Punjab
- District: Gujrat
- Time zone: UTC+5 (PST)

Thatta Musa (Urdu: ٹھٹھہ موسیٰ) is a village in Gujrat District in Punjab, Pakistan. It is approximately 5 kilometres (3.1 mi) northeast of Daudpur village, also in Gujrat, and 10 kilometres (6.2 mi) from the city of Jalalpur Jattan. According to the 2017 census, it had a population of 4,000
