= Gilli Wala =

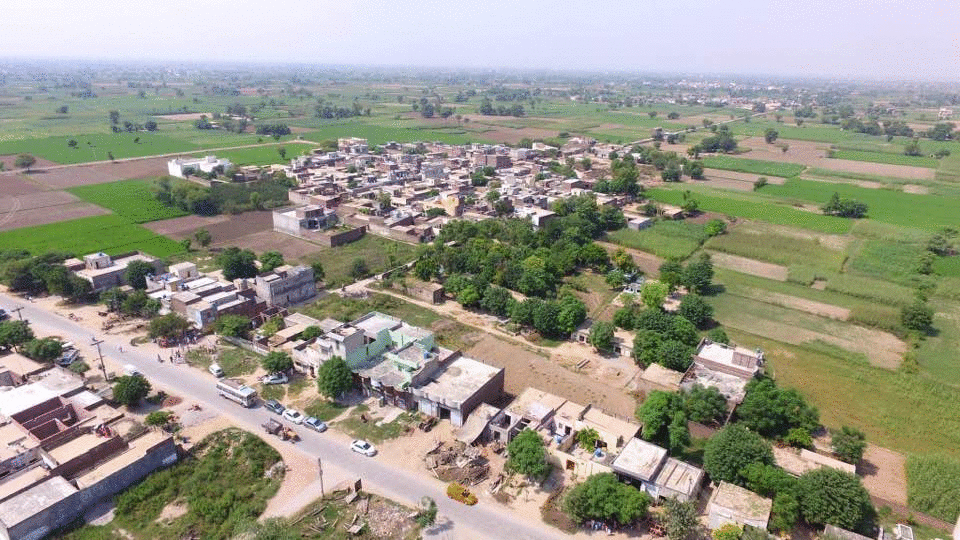

- Location in Pakistan
- Coordinates: 32.5925545°N 74.1953408°E
- Country: Pakistan
- Province: Punjab
- District: Gujrat
- City: Gujrat

Area
  - Urban: 0.055 km^{2} (0.021 sq mi)
- Time zone: UTC+5 (PST)

Gilli Wala is a village in Punjab, Pakistan, 11.5 kilometres (7.1 mi) east-northeast of Gujrat city, 117 kilometres (73 mi) north of the provincial capital Lahore, and 163 kilometres (101 mi) southeast of Islamabad, the national capital.

== Geography and climate ==
Gilli Wala is situated on the north bank of Chenab River in a fertile region along the river valleys, on the north-western edge of the geologic Indian Plate in South Asia. The village has a moderate climate. During the peak of summer, the daytime temperature shoots up to 45 °C (113 °F), but the hot weather is brief due to the proximity of the Azad Kashmir mountains and the foothills of the Himalayas. During the winter, the minimum temperature may fall below 2 °C (36 °F). The average rainfall is 67 centimetres (26 in). The surrounding lands are cultivated with rice, wheat and sugarcane. The Village have two Masjids, two Primary schools one for girls and another for boys, one High school and also higher secondary school for girls.
