= Chopala =

Coordinates: 32°38′35″N 74°19′34″E

Chopala چوپالہ
- Town and union council
- Interactive map of Chopala
- Country: Pakistan
- Province: Punjab
- District: Gujrat
- Tehsil: Gujrat
- Time zone: UTC+5 (PST)

Chopala is a town and union council of Gujrat District, in the Punjab province of Pakistan. It is located at 32°38'0N 74°20'0E, at an altitude of 229 metres (754 feet).
