= Bhand Gran =

Village in Pakistan

Coordinates: 32°50′35″N 74°01′23″E

Bhandgran is a small town in Gujrat District in the Punjab province of Pakistan. The town is about 5 km southwest of Kotla Arab Ali Khan. It consists of about 400 homes, with a population of about 6,000.

The village is served by three schools and seven mosques.
