= Rasool Pur, Gujrat =

Coordinates: 32°36′16.4″N 74°13′17.0″E

Rasool Pur رسول پور
- village
- Interactive map of Rasool Pur
- Country: Pakistan
- Province: Punjab
- District: Gujrat

Population
  - Total: 3,000
- Time zone: UTC+5 (PST)
- Calling code: 053

Rasool Pur (Urdu: رسول پور) is a village in the district of Gujrat, in the Punjab province of Pakistan. It has a population of 2000 - 3000 people.
