= Kotla Sarang Khan =

Village in Punjab, Pakistan

Coordinates: 32.65352°N 73.92691°E

Kotla Sarang Khan کوٹلہ سارنگ خان
- Interactive map of Kotla Sarang Khan
- Country: Pakistan
- Province: Punjab
- Division: Gujrat
- District: Gujrat
- Tehsil: Kharian

Kotla Sarang Khan is a village located in Kharian Tehsil, Gujrat District in Punjab Province of Pakistan.

The nearest town, Lalamusa, is seven kilometers to the northeast. The village has a population of almost 10,000 and holds two seats in the local area government union council. The main occupation is farming.

== History ==
Most popular traditions hold that the village was named after Sultan Sarang Khan Ghakkar who established an outpost on the site of the present village in the 16th century to protect against attacks by the Sur Empire after Humayun had fled to Persia. The population has increased very slowly. After the Afghan war, some Afghan refugees chose to remain in the village and some of them still live with their families in the area.

== Basic amenities ==
Electricity and telephone service are now provided to this remote village after long effort by village residents. Broadband facility is also available. The nearest health center is Rural Health Centre about 3 miles away.

== Education ==
Kotla has middle schools for boys and girls. The nearest high school is in Lalamusa.
