= Kan Mohla =

Coordinates: 32°36′18.5″N 74°15′29.7″E

Kan Mohla کاں موہلہ
- Interactive map of Kan Mohla
- Country: Pakistan
- Province: Punjab
- District: Gujrat
- Time zone: UTC+5 (PST)
- Calling code: 053

Kan Mohla (Urdu: کاں موہلہ) is a village in Gujrat District, of Punjab province, Pakistan.
