= Chak Bhola =

Coordinates: 32°36′5.6″N 74°07′4″E

Chak Bhola چک بھولا
- Interactive map of Chak Bhola
- Country: Pakistan
- Province: Punjab
- District: Gujrat
- Time zone: UTC+5 (PST)
- Calling code: 053

Chak Bhola (Urdu: چک بھولا) is a village situated in Gujrat District, in the Punjab province of Pakistan.
