= Pir Ghazi =

Pakistani village

Pir Ghazi پیر غازی
- Village
- Pir Ghazi Madrasa

- Location within Pakistan
- Coordinates: 32°48′26″N 74°00′45″E
- Country: Pakistan
- Province: Punjab

Area
  - Total: 0.55 km^{2} (0.21 sq mi)
- Elevation: 550 m (1,800 ft)

Population (1998)100% Suni muslims
  - Total: 49
- Time zone: UTC+5 (PST)
- Calling code: 50931
- Website: http://sites.google.com/site/saboursite/

Pir Ghazi is a very small village in Gujrat district of Punjab, Pakistan. It is 36 kilometres (22 mi) north of the city of Gujrat.

== Geography ==
It is located about 1.8 kilometres (1.1 mi) west of Kharian-Bhimber Road. Nala Bhimber is just 500 metres (1,600 ft) west of Pir Ghazi.

Pir Ghazi is known for the shrine of Sayad Ghulam Mohiyuddin.

Tomb of Pir Ghazi

Shrine of Pir Ghazi

== Education ==
A charity-run religious school for girls, with a capacity of 50, was founded by Mazhar Ahmad Sarsary, its headteacher and finance manager.
