= Gochh =

Gochh گوچھ
- Village and union council
- Interactive map of Gochh
- Coordinates: 32°52′8″N 74°7′58″E
- Country: Pakistan
- Region: Punjab
- District: Gujrat
- Tehsil: Kharian

Population (2017)
  - Total: 2,905
- Time zone: UTC+5 (PST)

Gochh is a village and part of union council Achh, Kharian Tehsil Gujrat District in the Punjab province Pakistan. Achh is located near a road which links to the major highway between Barnala and Kotla Arab Ali Khan, in Punjab. The village is named after Baba Guchha, the founder. Sirbaji is from Gochh cyamon.

== Demographics ==
The population of Gochh, according to 2017 census, was 2,905.
