= Shahni Kotli =

Coordinates: 32°36′13.8″N 74°14′41.2″E

Shahani Kotli شہانی کوٹلی
- Interactive map of Shahani Kotli
- Country: Pakistan
- Province: Punjab
- District: Gujrat
- Time zone: UTC+5 (PST)
- Calling code: 053

Shahni Kotli (Urdu: شہانی کوٹلی) is a village in the district of Gujrat, Pakistan. Most of the people in Shahni Kotli are Shia Muslims. There are two mosques and two Imambrigahs in village.

Syed Abu ul Hassan shah is Ex chairman of UC (Union Consul) Thatta Musa belongs to shahni Kotli.
