= Bajarwala =

Coordinates: 32°40′N 73°41′E

Bajarwala is a small village of Gujrat District in the province of Punjab, Pakistan. Bajarwala is located near the town of Dinga and its latitude and longitude is 32°65'31 N, 73°68'27 E. Bajarwala is about 140 km from the capital city of Islamabad.

== Education ==
The literacy rate of Bajarwala is more than 95%. There are two primary schools and one girls high school. There is also a madrasah for girls where free education is offered.

== Politics ==
There are approximately 962 voters in Bajarwala. In previous election most votes were cast for PML(Q), PML(N), and PTI.
