= Awan Sharif =

Awan Sharif اعوان شریف
- Interactive map of Awan Sharif
- Coordinates: 32°50′39″N 74°14′1″E
- Country: Pakistan
- Province: Punjab
- District: Gujrat
- Tehsil: Gujrat

Population
  - Total: 45−50k
- Postal code: 50870

Awan Sharif is a remote town of Gujrat District, in the Punjab province of Pakistan. It is the largest village of the district. It is the last town which connects Pakistan with Azad Kashmir. Awan Sharif also holds history as it was the first place which was attacked by India in the 1965 war's Battle of Chhamb - Jaurian.

The Tomb of Qazi Sultan Mehmood a famous saint of this area is also situated here. few notables of this area are also buried in front tomb.

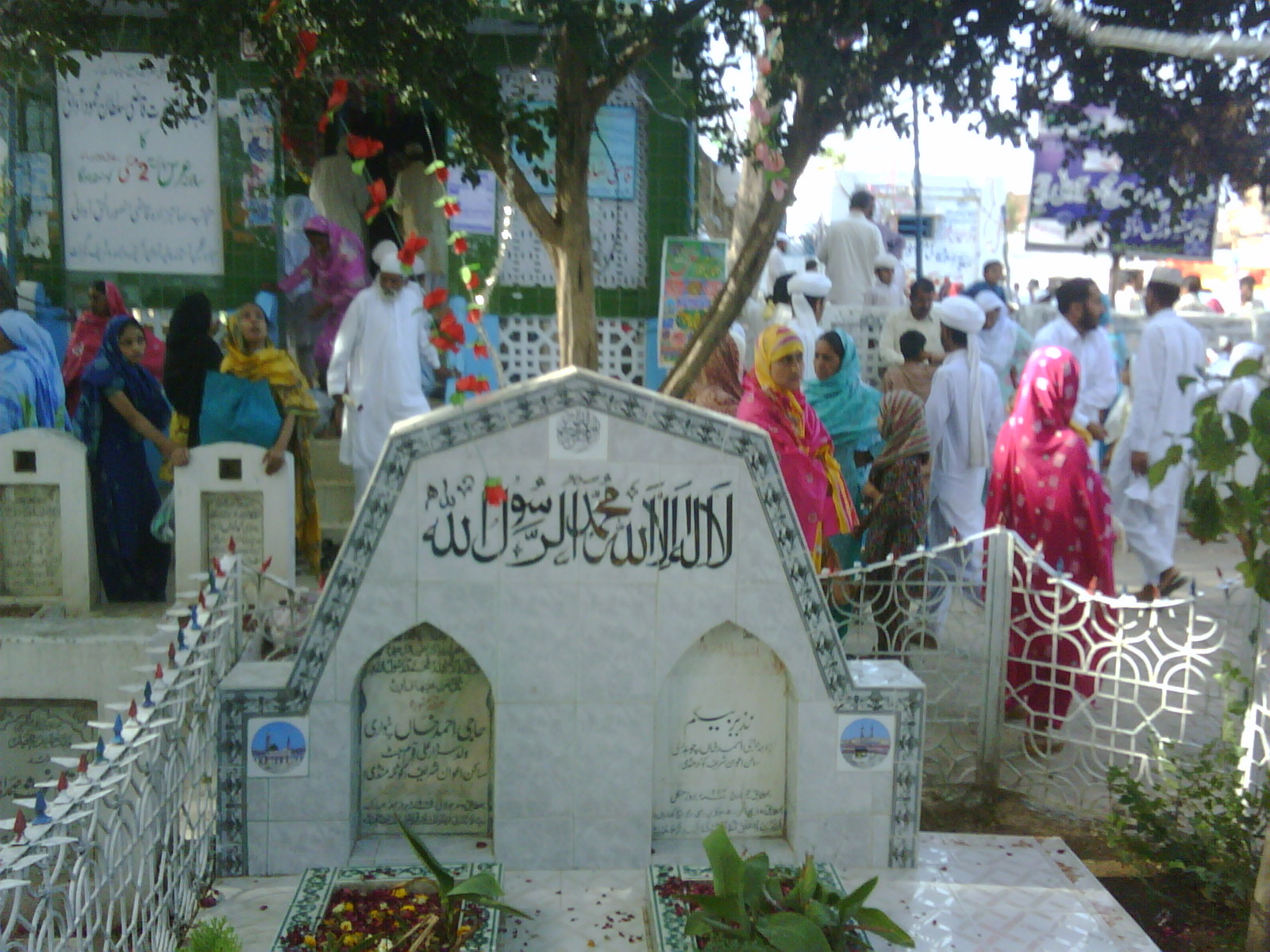
The Urs of famous saint of the area Qazi Sultan Mehmood
