= Mehmand Chak =

Mehmand Chak مہمند چک
- Village
- Location within Pakistan
- Coordinates: 32.47°N 73.49°E
- Country: Pakistan
- Province: Punjab
- District: Gujrat

Government
  - Landlord: Tariq Mehmood Nambardar (1990-Till Now)
- Elevation: 270 m (890 ft)

Population (2008)
  - Total: 3,500
- Time zone: UTC+5 (PST)
- Calling code: 05376

Mehmand Chak (Urdu: مہمند چک) is a village located in Kharian Tehsil, within the Gujrat District of Punjab, Pakistan. The village lies at 32°47′N 73°49.4′E, at an altitude of approximately 294 meters (965 feet) above sea level. Mehmand Chak comprises around 300 houses.

The population primarily consists of people from the Jutt and Mughal tribes, who have traditionally been engaged in agriculture and small-scale trade. Since the end of the 20th century, many residents from Mehmand Chak have migrated abroad and are now settled in the Middle East, the United Kingdom, Europe, and North America. These overseas communities maintain strong ties to their ancestral village and have contributed to its development. Almost all are well settled and live prosperous lives abroad.

Mehmand Chak is part of the fertile plains of Punjab and benefits from the region’s agricultural productivity. Administratively, it falls under the Kharian Tehsil Council and is connected by local roads to nearby towns such as Kharian and Gujrat.
