= Haji Imran Zafar =

Pakistani politician

Member of the Provincial Assembly of the Punjab
- In office 2010 – 31 May 2018

Personal details
- Born: 10 November 1973 (age 53) Gujrat District
- Party: Pakistan Muslim League (N)

Haji Imran Zafar is a Pakistani politician who was a Member of the Provincial Assembly of the Punjab, from 2010 to May 2018.

== Early life and education ==
He was born on 10 November 1973 in Gujrat District.

He has received Intermediate-level education.

== Political career ==
He was elected to the Provincial Assembly of the Punjab as a candidate of Pakistan Muslim League (N) (PML-N) from Constituency PP-111 (Gujrat-IV) in by-polls held in March 2010 and defeated Mian Imran Masood of PML-Q.

He was re-elected to the Provincial Assembly of the Punjab as a candidate of PML-N from Constituency PP-111 (Gujrat-IV) in the 2013 Pakistani general election. He received 35,515 votes and defeated Saleem Sarwar Jaura, a candidate of Pakistan Tehreek-e-Insaf (PTI). In the 2018 Pakistani general election he was defeated by PTI & PMLQ Joint candidate Chaudhry Saleem Jaura.
