= Kharana Pir Ghazi =

Kharana Pir Ghazi کھرانہ پِیر غازی
- Jamia Masjid Kharana Pir Ghazi

- Location within Pakistan
- Coordinates: 32°48′9″N 74°0′55″E
- Country: Pakistan
- Province: Punjab
- Elevation: 275 m (902 ft)

Population (1998)
  - Total: 27,915
- Time zone: UTC+5 (PST)
- Calling code: 50931

Kharana Pir Ghazi (کھرانہ پیر غازی) is a village in Kharian Tehsil of Gujrat District, in the Punjab province of Pakistan. It is situated 1.5 kilometers from the Kharian-Kotla Road. Kharana and Pir Ghazi are two villages, Kharana is in the east and Pir Ghazi in the west with a few houses and the shrine of Pir Ghazi.

== Demography ==
The majority of the population belongs to Awan Malik tribe. Until the late 1970s, agriculture and Army were the only fields where the people were working. Agriculture is a forgotten profession nowadays. Small land holdings and no proper source of irrigation have forced people to look for alternatives. From then on until the mid-1990s Middle East was the favourite destination for the workers. Now people from Kharana are working and living in Europe. Few are well settled and living with their families in Europe. Kharana Pir Ghazi has served nation with all its might in army navy and air force.

== Infrastructure ==
Mosques

1. Jamia Masjid Toheed Kharana Pir Ghazi.
2. Madni Masjid Kharana Pir Ghazi.

Schools

1. Government Primary school for Boys Kharana Pir Ghazi.
2. Government Primary school for Girls Kharana Pir Ghazi.

Roads Kharana is well connected by Roads in all four directions.

1. Kharana to Pir Ghazi Road. (West)
2. Kharana to Kotla Kharian Road. (East)
3. Kharana to Bhurchh Road. (North)
4. Kharana to Sidh Road. (South)

Electricity

1. Kharana Pir Ghazi was connected with Electricity supply line in early 1980s.

Telephone

1. Kharana Pir Ghazi is connected with the world through Sidh Telephone Exchange of PTCL in early 1990s.

LFO

1. The young people of kpg make an organization LFO "live for other" in 2005 which help the poor and needy people in kpg and also in union council Bhaddar.

www.lfokpg.org Pictures of Kharana Pir Ghazi "https://picasaweb.google.com/javedsbr/KharanaPirGhaziFebMarch2010#"
