= Chakori Bhalowal =

Coordinates: 32°36′0″N 73°54′0″E

Chakori Bhelowal چکوڑی بھیلووال
- Town and union council
- Interactive map of Chakori Bhelowal
- Country: Pakistan
- Province: Punjab
- Division: Gujrat
- District: Gujrat
- Tehsil: Kharian

Government
  - Type: PML

Population
  - Total: 10,000/-(Ten Thousand People)
- Time zone: UTC+5 (PST)
- Postal code: 50201

Chakori Bhilowal is a town and union council of Gujrat District, in the Punjab province of Pakistan. It is part of Kharian Tehsil and is located at 32°36'0N 73°54'0E with an altitude of 226 metres (744 feet).

== History ==
Chakori Bhelowal is part of Kharian Tehsil and located some 17 km west of the city of Gujrat on Dinga Road. It is one of the oldest villages of its area. This village is known by several names like Chakori Shareef, Chakori Sahibzada but most popular as Chakori Bhelowal of the bank of Upper Jhelum Canal.

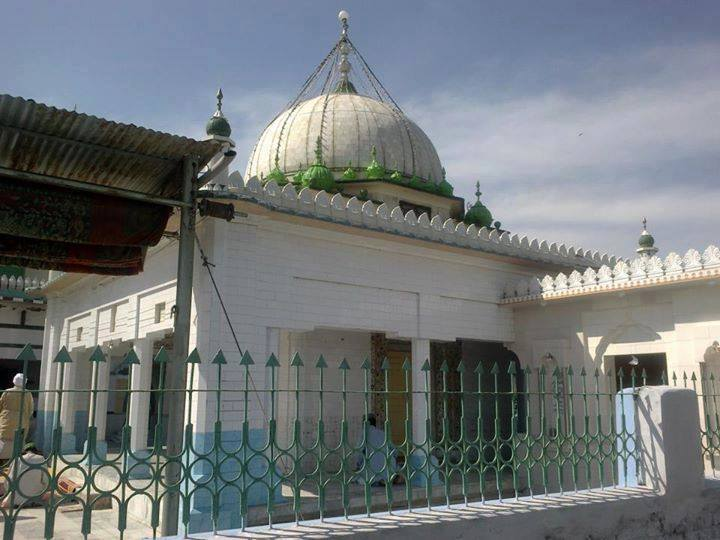
Mausoleum of Syed Ghulam Sarwar Shah Sahib, a Sufi saint from Chakori Bhalowal

According to the beliefs of the local people, the first settlers were farmers from Russia. They came and settled there after the Mughals took over India. Free water and fertile land attracted them and they decided to live here. Later they became popular as the Bhilowal tribe. The village was founded around 14–15 generations before by a man called Bhilo Chand he migrated from Russia with his brother Sabo Chand, his brother Sabo Chand settled in a village called Sabowal. Bhilo descendants are all part of the Bhilowal family which is the largest family in Chakori Bhilowal.

Hindu and Sikh landowner also lived in this village before the division of India. Some of the streets are very narrow, majority of people are farmers and everyone is Muslim. Bhilowal, Kattaria, Mehngay, Lakhan, Babay Mastay Kay, Babay Gulloo Kay and Babay Hayaat Kay tribes are largest tribe, most influential these families own most of the land in this area and most of them use the contract system to cultivate their land. Some people belonging to these families have settled abroad. There are many other small tribes in Chakori Bhilowal but they are not financially strong and either work as farmers or run small stores within the village.
There are three government schools, two for boys and one for girls. One of them is Govt High school Chakori Bhelowal, second is Govt Boys Primary school Chakori Bhelowal, & third is Govt Girls High school Chakori Bhelowal. There are also 4 private schools in the village.

In 1953, some people belongings to the Kattaria tribe left their houses and settled in their fields about 1 mile away from the main village. They formed a small colony of about 35 houses in total situated on both sides of the Dinga road and started cultivating their barren land. Although they have formed a separate village but they consider it as a branch of the Chakori Bhilowal because on paper it is still part of the village's land. However, some people also call is as ‘Nai Chakori’ or ‘New Chakori’.

The office of Union Council is located on the Dinga road. There is a high school for boys and a high school for girls both run by the Government. Beside these there are many private schools with the village but the standard of education in all educational institutions including the Government and private schools is below the mark. A Government hospital is under construction on Dinga road, located in Dulanwala. Most of the people are educated. cricket and volleyball are played in all corners of the village. After the harvest of wheat, matches are held between different mohalas.
