= Machiwaal =

- Village and Union Council
- Interactive map of Machiwaal
- Coordinates: 32.7216°N 74.0221°E
- Country: Pakistan
- Province: Punjab
- District: Gujrat

Government
- Time zone: UTC+5 (PST)

Machiwaal is a 250-year-old village located in the Gujrat district, in the south of Punjab, Pakistan. It is an agricultural community, with 95% of the population engaged in farming, while the remainder live abroad. Major crops are wheat, millet, and rice, along with peas and pulses. A grand festival is conducted when the wheat crop is harvested every year in April.

The population is Muslim, with 93% Sunni and 7% Shi'a. The village has three schools which provide primary education, as well as a high school. Punjabi and Urdu are the two local languages. Machiwaal has a literacy rate of 38%.
