= Khambi, Gujrat =

Village in Punjab, Pakistan

Khambi is a large village of Sarai Alamgir Tehsil, Gujrat District, in the Punjab province, Pakistan. It is bounded on two sides by the river Jhelum and Upper Jhelum Canal and on the other two sides by small streams.

Khambi village has divided into three different parts: Tawela, Jalilpur and Khambi.

== Education ==
There is a Government Elementary School located in Khambi, and other schools such as Noble Public High School, Alhijaz High School and Alamgir public high school.
