= Hajiwala =

Hajiwala حاجیوالہ
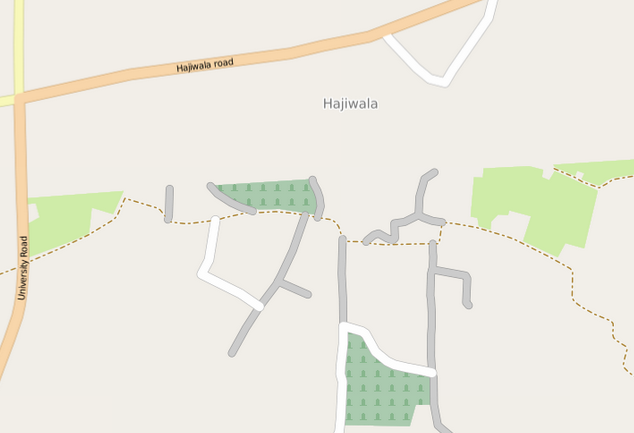
- Map of Hajiwala
- Coordinates: 32°43′56″N 74°14′05″E
- Country: Pakistan
- Province: Punjab
- District: Gujrat
- Time zone: UTC+5 (PST)
- Calling code: 053

Hajiwala (Urdu: حاجیوالہ) is a village in Gujrat District, of the Punjab province, Pakistan.
