= Bagrianwala =

Coordinates: 32°33′0″N 73°52′0″E

Bagrianwala باگڑیانوالہ
- Town and union council
- Interactive map of Bagrianwala
- Country: Pakistan
- Region: Punjab province
- Division: Gujrat
- District: Gujrat
- Tehsil: Kharian
- Time zone: UTC+5 (PST)

Bagrianwala is a historic village of Sahi Jat clan which are well known because of their bravery. Bagrianwala is a town and union council of Gujrat District, in the Punjab province of Pakistan. Chaudhary Ashraf Sahi is the only person in the history of Tehsil Kharian who won an unopposed election and was elected as Nazim of UC Bagrianwala. It is part of Kharian Tehsil and is located at 32°33'0N 73°52'0E at an altitude of 217 metres (715 feet).
