= Gegi (clan) =

Clan of Gujjar

Gegi, Gaigi, or Gagian is a clan (sub-caste) of the agricultural Punjabi Gujjar community of Punjab. Their main villages are located in Jhelum, Gujaranwala, and Gujrat districts in the central Punjab, Pakistan. The clan is also found in Indian-administered Jammu and Kashmir, Pakistani-administrated-Kashmir and in the Gilgit-Baltistan region.

== History ==
Gagian, located northeast of Gujrat City, Punjab, was founded by the Gegi clan, of the Gurjars who became Muslims in the 17th century during the reign of Aurangzeb. The word Gagian was derived from the Gaigi sub-caste of Gujjar clan. It was populated by two major sub-castes namely Barkatt (Bargatt) and Gaigis. Other Gotras of Gujjar tribe live in Gagian village, including Cheechi, Khatana, Thikri and Chauhans. The entire population practices the Islamic faith and expresses relatively tolerant religious views closely related to traditional Sufi culture.

=== Shrine ===
The shrine of Sufi saint Baba Saeen Chirag Badshah is located in Gagian. Saint Baba Sher Ghazi, now buried in Chakori Sher Ghazi in Tehsil Kharian, originally belonged to Gagian Gujjars.

== Economy ==
The primary occupation is agriculture, attracting many settlers.

== Notables ==
- Muhammad Asghar (late) (President Pakistan Wrestling Federation)
