= Bhakoki =

Coordinates: 32°36′56.3″N 74°12′39.9″E

Bhakoki بھکوکی
- Interactive map of Bhakoki
- Country: Pakistan
- Province: Punjab
- District: Gujrat
- Time zone: UTC+5 (PST)
- Calling code: 053

Bhakoki (Urdu: بھکوکی) is a village situated in the district of Gujrat, the Punjab province of Pakistan.
