= Mangowal Gharbi =

Mangowal Gharbi منگووال غربی
- Location within Pakistan Location within Punjab, Pakistan
- Coordinates: 32.494479°N 73.892230°E
- Country: Pakistan
- Province: Punjab
- District: Gujrat

Government
  - Post code: 50640

Population
  - Total: 6,000
- Time zone: UTC+5 (PST)
- Calling code: 053
- Union council No: 14

Mangowal Gharbi (منگووال غربی), or West Mangowal in English, is a town and Union Council headquarters in Gujrat District in the Punjab province, Pakistan. The town is well known for its flour mills and the quality of its rice.

== See also ==
- Mangowal Sharqi
