= Geowanjal =

Coordinates: 32°36′21.3″N 74°13′53.1″E

Geowanjal Moh Khan Pura محلہ خان پورہ جیو ونجل
- Interactive map of Geowanjal Moh Khan Pura
- Country: Pakistan
- Province: Punjab
- District: Gujrat

Government
- Time zone: UTC+5 (PST)
- Calling code: 053

Geowanjal or Geo Wanjal Moh Khan Pura (Urdu: جیو ونجل محلہ خان پورہ) is a village in the district of Gujrat, Pakistan. It is about 6 km from Jalalpur Jattan. It is situated near the Chenab river.
