= Basrian =

- Country: Pakistan
- Province: Punjab

Basrian is a village of Gujrat District, in the Punjab province of Pakistan. It is part of Kharian Tehsil and is located at 32°74'0N 73°82'0E.

Basrian
| Region | Gujranwala |
| District | Gujrat |
| Tehsil | Kharian |
| Time zone | PST (UTC+5) |

Basrian has many communities – Gujjar (Dehdar) is the major community; Arian is the second largest community. Basrian used to be an agricultural village, but many people have gone abroad for temporarily employment and business. Many have settled abroad in almost every country of the world. It is a fairly rich and small town near Dinga-Kharian Road.
