= Dittewal =

Dittewall دیتوال
- Location within Pakistan
- Coordinates: 32.597910°N 73.990635°E
- Country: Pakistan
- Province: Punjab
- District: Gujrat District
- Time zone: UTC+5 (PST)

Dittewall (Urdu: دیتوال) is a village in Gujrat District, Punjab, Pakistan, The village is located outside of the city of Gujrat. The city lies to the east of the neighboring village of Chak Pindi.
