= Alamgarh =

Coordinates: 32°41′0″N 74°10′0″E

- Town and union Council 25
- Interactive map of Alamgarh
- Country: Pakistan
- Province: Punjab
- District: Gujrat
- Time zone: UTC+5 (PST)

Alamgarh is a town and union council of Gujrat District, in the Punjab province of Pakistan.

== See also ==
- Thimka
