= Sheikh Pur =

Sheikh Pur is a village in the eastern part of Gujrat District in the Punjab province of Pakistan. The village is situated along the bank of the Chenab river.

== Demographics ==
The population of the village, according to the 2017 census was 4,196.
