= Behilpur =

Behil pur بہل پور
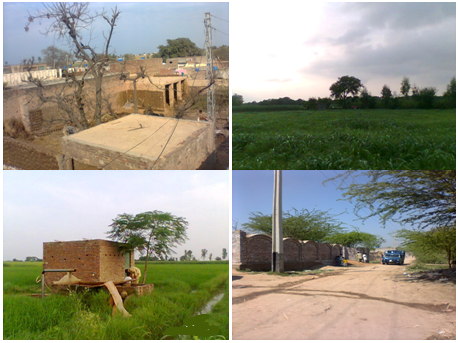
- Pictures of the village

- Location within Pakistan
- Coordinates: 32°38′44.8″N 74°16′33.21″E
- Country: Pakistan
- Province: Punjab
- District: Gujrat
- Time zone: UTC+5 (PST)
- Calling code: 053

Behilpur is a village in Gujrat District, Punjab, Pakistan.

== Location ==
Situated near Jalalpur Jattan, the village is almost 22 kilometers from Gujrat city.

== Climate ==
The village has a moderate climate. During the peak of summer, the daytime temperature shoots up to 45 °C (113 °F), but the hot spells are relatively short due to the proximity of the Azad Kashmir Mountains. During the winter, the minimum temperature may fall below 2 °C (36 °F). The average rainfall at Behil Pur is 67 centimetres (26 in).
