= Bhimber Dam =

Dam in Pakistan

- Interactive map of Bhimber Dam
- Official name: بند بھمبر
- Country: Pakistan
- Location: Bhimber District, Azad Kashmir
- Coordinates: 32.92960267162569°N 74.04055020766287°E
- Purpose: Power
- Status: Proposed
- Construction began: January, 2023 (expected)
- Opening date: December, 2025
- Construction cost: Rs. 86.089 million
- Operator: WAPDA

Dam and spillways
- Type of dam: Earth fill and Rock-fill dam
- Impounds: Bhimber Nullah
- Height (foundation): 60.96 m

Reservoir
- Active capacity: 28,700 AF

Power Station
- Installed capacity: 0.5 MW

Bhimber Dam is an under construction dam being built over Bhimber Nullah located in Bhimber District, Azad Kashmir, Pakistan. The project is located on Bhimber Nullah about 10 km u/s of Bhimber-Gujrat Road Bridge in District Bhimber, Azad Kashmir. The proposed commencement date is January 2023, and it is to be completed by December 2025.
