= Saroki =

Village in Gujrat District, Pakistan

- Village
- Location in Pakistan
- Coordinates: 32°32′58″N 73°59′39″E
- Country: Pakistan
- Province: Punjab
- District: Gujrat

Saroki is a village in Gujrat District, in the Punjab province of Pakistan.
