= Khambi, Palwal =

Villiage in Haryana, India

Khambi
- Village
- Interactive map of Khambi
- Coordinates: 20°53′N 80°01′E
- Country: India
- State: Haryana
- District: Palwal

Khambi is a village in Palwal District in the State of Haryana, India. It is located 24 km from Palwal and 11 km from Hodal. The Delhi Agra canal flows near the village and the Yamuna River is located 8 km east of the village.
