= Kotli Kohala =

Kotli Kohala کوٹلی کوہالہ
- Location within Punjab, Pakistan Location within Pakistan
- Country: Pakistan
- Province: Punjab
- District: Gujrat

Government

Area
  - Total: 10 km^{2} (3.9 sq mi)
- Time zone: UTC+5 (PKT)
- Calling code: 53

Kotli Kohala (Urdu: کوٹلی کوہالہ) is a village in Gujrat District in the Punjab province of Pakistan.
