= Wada Pind =

Archaeological site in Nowshera, Pakistan

Wada Pind is an archaeological site in Nowshera District of Khyber Pakhtunkhwa Province of Pakistan. Although some remains of the site made of clay are visible, the site dates back to Buddhist period, probably of the reign of Kushan Empire.
