= Thimka =

Coordinates: 32°40′26.4″N 74°11′23.6″E

Thimka ٹھمکا
- Interactive map of Thimka
- Country: Pakistan
- Province: Punjab
- District: Gujrat
- Time zone: UTC+5 (PST)
- Calling code: 053

Thimka (Urdu: ٹھمکا) is a village situated near Alamgarh in Gujrat District, in the Punjab province of Pakistan.
