= Beowali =

Beowali بیووالی
- Village
- Location within Punjab, Pakistan Location within Pakistan
- Country: Pakistan
- Province: Punjab
- District: Gujrat
- Time zone: UTC+5 (PKT)
- Calling code: 053

Beowali (Urdu: بیووالی) is a village situated alongside Jalalpur–Gujrat Road in Gujrat District, of Punjab Pakistan.
