= Hakla =

Gurjar clan of south Asia

Hakla Haklla
- Religions: Hinduism, Sikhism, Islam
- Languages: Gujari; Punjabi; Gujarati; Haryanvi; Marwari; Pahari; Pashto; Balochi; Hindi
- Country: India; Pakistan
- Region: Gujarat; Rajasthan Punjab; Kashmir; Sindh; Balochistan; Haryana; Himachal Pradesh; Uttar Pradesh
- Ethnicity: Gurjar (Gujjar)
- Lineage: Hindu

Hakla, sometime spelled as Haklla or Akla, is a clan originally affiliated with the Gurjar/Gujjar ethnic group of South Asia. They are mostly found among the Hindu and Muslim Gujjars.

== Ethnography ==
They are found in the Punjab, Balochistan, Azad Kashmir and Khyber Pakhtunkhwa provinces of Pakistan. In India, they are mainly located in multiple Indian states, including Punjab (Hoshiarpur), Gujarat, Haryana, Rajasthan, Uttar Pradesh, Jammu and Kashmir and Himachal Pradesh.

== Notes ==
1. H.C Norman (1908) Journal & Proceedings of the Asiatic Society of Bengal: Volume 4 Asiatic Society. p.247, 280
2. Sir Edward Maclagan and H.A. Rose (1911) A Glossary of the Tribes & Castes of the Punjab & North-west Frontier Province: Based on the Census Report for the Punjab, 1883, by the Late Sir Denzil Ibbetson ... & the Census Report for the Punjab, 1892 Superintendent, government printing, Punjab. p.314
3. Horace Arthur Rose (1910) Index to Punjab Notes and Queries, V. I-III: Indian Notes and Queries, V. IV; North Indian Notes and Queries, V. I-V. Asiatic Society of Bengal. p.247
