= Sahan Kalan =

Sahan Kalan: سہان کلاں
- Village
- Location within Punjab, Pakistan Location within Pakistan
- Coordinates: 32°49′30″N 74°06′17″E
- Country: Pakistan
- Province: Punjab
- District: Gujrat
- Time zone: UTC+5 (PST)

Sahan Kalan is a village in Tehsil Kharian of Gujrat District in Punjab (Pakistan). It lies approximately 4 kilometres southeast of Kotla Arab Ali Khan and 35 kilometres north of Gujrat.

The Thathaal Jats form the predominant community in Sahan Kalan.
