= Bhalot Shera =

Coordinates: 32°37′37″N 073°53′41″E

- Village
- Interactive map of Bhalot Shera
- Country: Pakistan
- Province: Punjab
- District: Gujrat
- Time zone: UTC+5 (PST)

Bhalot /Bhalote Shera (Punjabi, Urdu: بھلوٹ شیرا) is a village in Gujrat District, Punjab, Pakistan.

Al Syeda Fatima tul Zahara Model School and College is situated in the village.

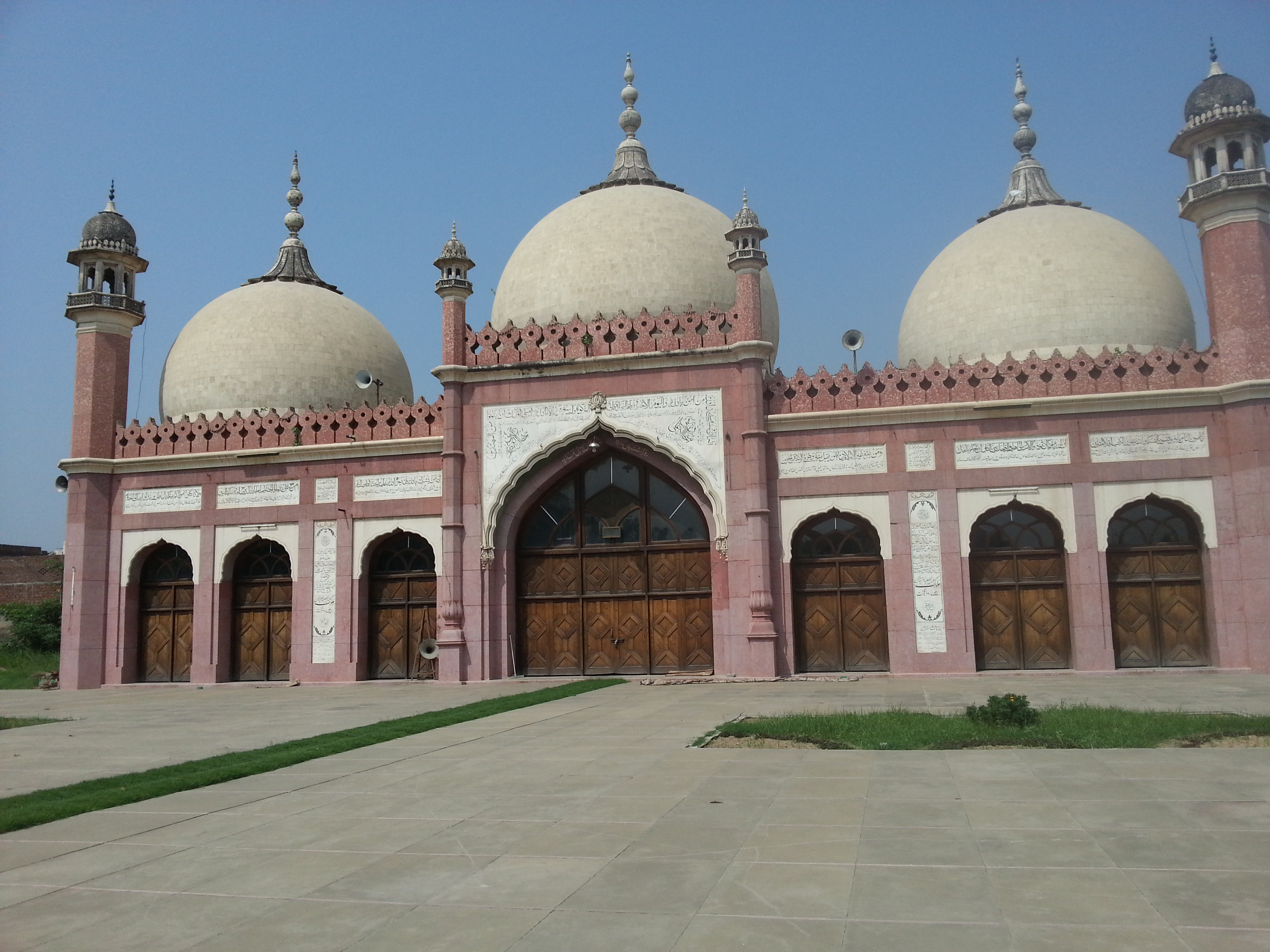
Gujrat's oldest mosque dates from the Mughal era, and resembles Lahore's Badshahi Mosque.
