= Chakori Sher Ghazi =

Coordinates: 32°40′30″N 73°57′40″E

Chakori Sher Ghazi چکوڑی شیرغازی
- Town and union council
- Interactive map of Chakori Sher Ghazi
- Country: Pakistan
- Province: Punjab
- District: Gujrat
- Tehsil: Kharian

Government

Area
  - Total: 1 km^{2} (0.39 sq mi)

Population
  - Total: 10,000
- Time zone: UTC+5 (PST)
- Postal code: Lalamusa

Chakori Sher Ghazi is a town and union council of Gujrat District, in the Punjab province of Pakistan. It is part of Kharian Tehsil and located at 32°40'30N 73°57'40E, at an altitude of 253 metres (833 feet).

== Notable people ==
Sahabzada Imran Ahmed - Philanthropist and politician
