= Mangowal Sharqi =

Mangowal Sharqi منگووال شرقی
- Location within Pakistan
- Coordinates: 32.700269°N 74.255958°E
- Country: Pakistan
- Province: Punjab
- District: Gujrat
- Time zone: UTC+5 (PST)
- Calling code: 053
- Postal code: 50781

Mangowal Sharqi (Urdu: منگووال شرقی lit. East Mangowal) is a village situated near Jalalpur Jattan cantonment in Gujrat District of Punjab, Pakistan. It is the third-largest village in the district. The village is situated at bifurcation leading to Tanda and Karianwala.

According to local traditions, this village is about 300 years old. The history of the village is not well known.

== See also ==
- Mangowal Gharbi
