= Kot Rahim Shah =

Coordinates: 32°28′0″N 73°39′0″E

Kot Reham Shah کوٹ رحم شاہ
- Village
- Kot Reham Shah
- Interactive map of Kot Reham Shah
- Country: Pakistan
- Province: Punjab
- Gujranwala Division: Gujranwala Division
- District: Mandi Bahauddin

Kot Reham Shah is a village in Mandi Bahauddin District, Punjab, Pakistan. It is about 121 kilometres (75 mi) from Lahore.
