= Sarai Alamgir =

Town in Punjab, Pakistan

Sarai Alamgir سرائے عالمگیر
- City
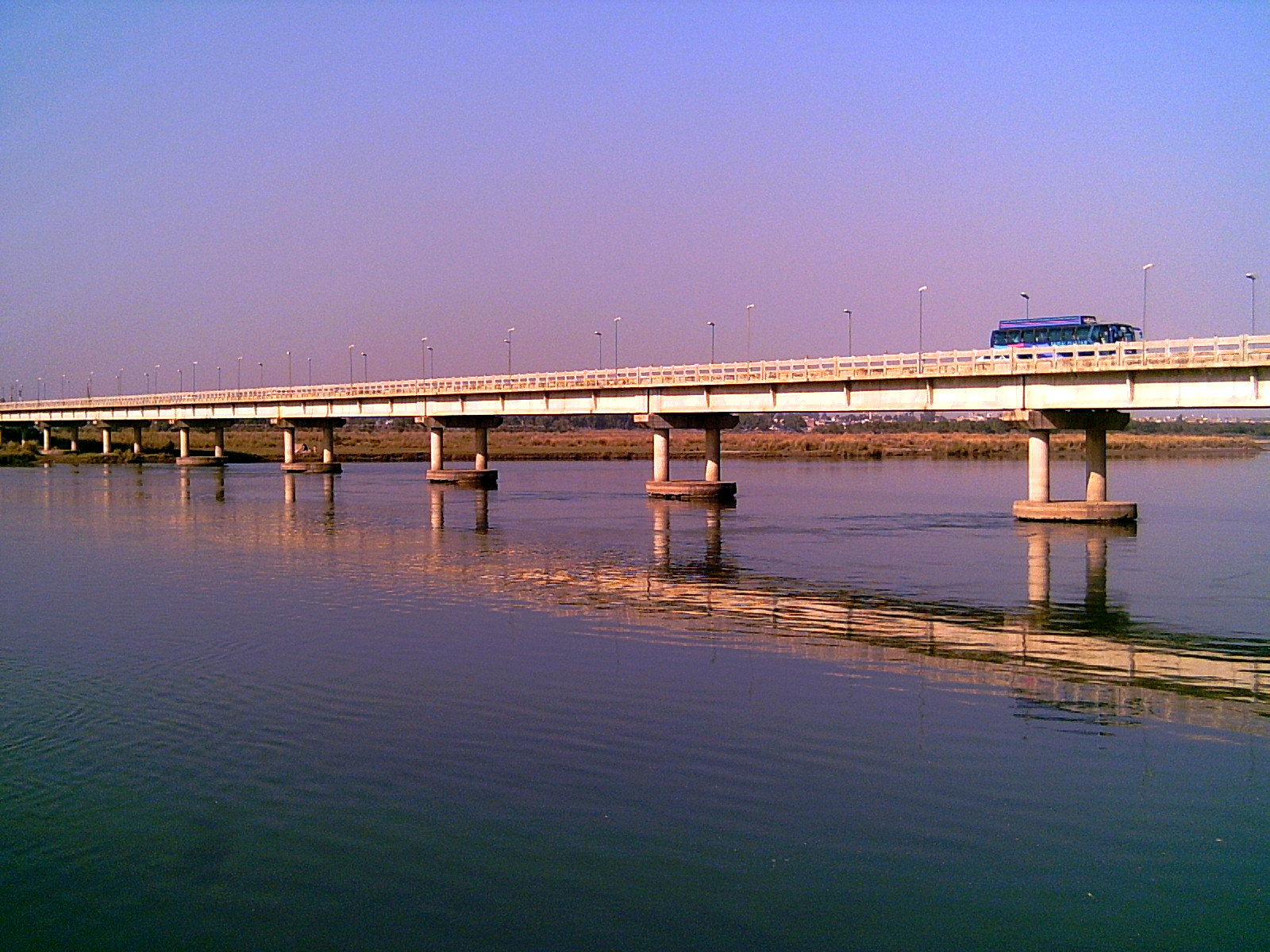
- A bridge on the River Jhelum, seen from Sarai Alamgir

- Location in Pakistan
- Coordinates: 32°54′N 73°45′E
- Country: Pakistan
- Province: Punjab
- Division: Gujrat
- District: Gujrat
- Towns: 4
- Union councils: 7

Population (2023)
  - Total: 73,967
- Time zone: UTC+5 (PKT)
  - Summer (DST): UTC+6 (PDT)
- Postal code: 50000

Sarai Alamgir (Punjabi: سرائے عالمگیر , Urdu: سرائے عالمگیر) is the main town of Sarai Alamgir Tehsil, located in the Gujrat district in the north of the Punjab, a province of Pakistan. Sarai Alamgir is one of four tehsils of Gujrat district.

The Sarai Alamgir town was mainly founded by the Mughal emperor Aurangzeb Alamgir. That's why the name of town was given Sarai Alamgir which means Sarai of Alamgir because this place was used as "Sarai" (rest area) by the army of Aurangzeb Alamgir. The town also gains strategic importance that time due to its position at Grand Trunk Road (GT Road) originally built by the emperor Sher Shah Suri (1472- 1545).

Sarai Alamgir covers 575 km^{2} (222 sq mi) on the eastern bank of the Jhelum River, across from the larger town of Jhelum. East of the town is the Upper Jhelum Canal. Sarai Alamgir was raised to the level of Municipal Committee in 1976. After the implementation of Punjab Local Government Ordinance 2001, it was given the status of Tehsil Municipal Administration (TMA).

== Geography and climate ==
Sarai is located at 32°54′00″N 73°45′00″E (32.900000, 73.750000); it lies at 232 m (761 ft) above sea level. The municipality has a moderate climate. During the summer, temperatures can reach 45 °C (113 °F) for short periods. Winter months are mild, temperatures rarely falling below 1 °C (34 °F). Sarai Alamgir is located south of Jhelum City, which lies across the Jhelum River. To the north of Sarai, cities are Mirpure and Bhimber. Mandi Bahauddin and Rasul are located to the south of Sarai Alamgir.

== History ==
In ancient history, the region participated in the Indus Valley civilization and the Gandhara civilization. At a later date, the Battle of the Hydaspes took place nearby, between the armies of Alexander the Great and the Great King Porus. In the past, influential people of the region would build a Sarai, which would be caravan stations and rest houses for travelers. A typical Sarai would consist of a drinking well, a praying area and a resting place for people.

The 'Sarai' (rest area) at Sarai Alamgir was founded by the Mughal emperor Aurangzeb because of its strategic location on the Grand Trunk Road and the Jhelum River, and its proximity to Kashmir. Over time, Sarai Alamgir developed into a central town for adjoining village populations.

Sarai Alamgir gained prominence when the King George V Royal Indian Military School was established on 3 March 1922; it was one of four such cadet schools in British India to benefit the sons of members of the Royal Indian Army. The college is now known as the Military College Jhelum and is one of the oldest institutions in Pakistan.

== Demographics ==
The population of city in 1972 was 2,609 but according to the 2023 Census of Pakistan, the population has risen to 73,967.

Census	Population
1972	2,609
1981	23,664
1998	37,166
2017	54,864
2023	73,967

=== Language ===
Urban population of Sarai Alamgir Tehsil
1. Punjabi (80.4%)
2. Urdu (14.7%)
3. Pashto (3.62%)
4. Others (1.28%)

In the 2023 census, 80.40% of the population spoke Punjabi, 14.70% spoke Urdu, 3.62% spoke Pashto and 1.28% of the population spoke other languages (mostly Sindhi and Saraiki).

== Administration ==
The Tehsil Municipal Administration is a corporate body and consists of the Tehsil Nazim, Tehsil Municipal Officer, four Tehsil Officers and other officials of the Local Council Service, and officials of the offices entrusted to the Tehsil Municipal Administration. A Tehsil Nazim is the head of Tehsil Municipal Administration and exercises all functions and powers assigned to him under the Ordinance. The Tehsil Municipal Officer acts as coordinating and administrative officer, in charge of the Tehsil Officers.

== Surrounding important places ==
Sarai Alamgir is a historic crossroads between the ancient Grand Trunk Road and the Jhelum River. Nearby are the sites of the Battle of the Hydaspes, the historic and ancient Alexandrian city of Bukephala (or Bucephala) and the huge Rohtas Fort.

== Boundaries ==
Sarai Alamgir city has these cities in its surrounding areas:

=== West ===
Jhelum

=== East ===
Kharian

=== North ===
Mirpur, Azad Kashmir

=== South ===
Mandi Bahauddin

== Communications ==
The nearest international airports are at Islamabad and Sialkot, about 127 km (79 mi) and 90 km (56 mi) away, respectively. There are other transport links to the town, including a railway station, the Grand Trunk Road, the Jhelum River and the Upper Jhelum Canal. Sarai Alamgir is located on GT Road (N5) and Pakistan's main railway line. A highway connects it with Mandi Bahauddin, while the other one goes to Mirpur, Azad Kashmir. A Motorway interchange is also in the pipeline which will be completed by 2023.

== Villages ==
- Balobanaian is a largest village of Sarai Alamgir. It is almost 22 km from the town.
- ChakJani is Highly valued village of Sarai Alamgir.
