= Sarai Alamgir Tehsil =

Pakistani administrative subdivision

Sarai Alamgir Tehsil تحصیل سرائے عالمگیر
- Tehsil
- Location in Pakistan
- Coordinates: 32°54′N 73°45′E
- Country: Pakistan
- Province: Punjab
- District: Gujrat
- Towns: 4
- Union councils: 9

Government
  - Governing Person: Nazim
  - Second Level of governance: Naib nazim

Area
  - Tehsil: 575 km^{2} (222 sq mi)

Population (2023)
  - Tehsil: 247,333
  - Density: 304/km^{2} (790/sq mi)
  - Urban: 55,007
  - Rural: 192,326
- Time zone: UTC+5 (PST)
  - Summer (DST): UTC+5 (PDT)

Sarai Alamgir Tehsil (Urdu: تحصیل سرائے عالمگیر) is one of four administrative subdivision areas, or Tehsils, in Gujrat District, in the Punjab province of Pakistan. The Tehsil is located on the eastern bank of the Jhelum River across from the city of Jhelum. Upper Jhelum Canal flows east of the Tehsil.

== Geography and climate ==
Sarai is located at 32°54′00″N 73°45′00″E (32.900000, 73.750000) and lies at an altitude of 232 metres (763 ft) above sea-level.

The Tehsil as a whole has a moderate climate. In summer, temperatures can reach 48 °C, but the hot spells are comparatively short. The winter months are very pleasant with temperatures rarely falling below 2 °C.

== Location ==
Sarai Alamgir Tehsil is south of the city of Gujrat, Punjab, Pakistan.

== History ==
The actual town of Sarai was founded by the Mughal emperor Aurangzeb because of its strategic location on the Grand Trunk Road and the Jhelum River as well as its proximity to Kashmir. Sarai Alamgir was given status of Tehsil in 1993.

== Administrative setup ==
The Tehsil Municipal Administration is a corporate body and consists of the Administrator, Tehsil Municipal Officer, 4 Tehsil Officers and other officials of the Local Council Service and officials of the offices entrusted to the Tehsil Municipal Administration. Administrator is the head of Tehsil Municipal Administration and exercises all powers as have been assigned to him under the Ordinance. The Tehsil Municipal Officer is acting as coordinating and administrative officer in-charge of the Tehsil Officers.

== Union Councils ==
Sarai Alamgir Tehsil has 9 union councils:

- Mandi Bhalwal
- Bagh Nagar
- Karyala
- Simbli
- Khohar
- Sarai Alamgir-I
- Sarai Alamgir-II
- Thill Bakohal
- Baisa
- Total population is 175,287 (as per Government of Punjab figures from 1998).

== Transport ==
The nearest international airport is at Islamabad, about 127 km (79 mi) away. However, there are good transport links including a railway station, the Grand Trunk Road, the Jhelum River for travel by boat and the Upper Jhelum Canal.

== Sites of interest nearby ==
Sarai Alamgir is situated on historic crossroads between the ancient Grand Trunk Road and the Jhelum River. Nearby are the Mangla Dam, the site of the Battle of the Hydaspes, the city of Alexandria Bucephalous founded by Alexander the Great, and the huge Rohtas Fort.

== Related places ==
- Sarai Alamgir Town
- Gujrat District
- Choa Rajgan
- Choa jattan
