= Gujrat Tehsil =

Administrative subdivision in Punjab, Pakistan

Gujrat Tehsil تحصیل گجرات
- Tehsil
- Tehsil Municipal Administration logo
- Country: Pakistan
- Region: (Punjab, Pakistan) Punjab
- District: Gujrat
- Towns: 1
- Union councils: 65

Government
  - MNA: Jafar Iqbal
  - MPA: Ammad Anwar Gujjar

Area
  - Tehsil: 1,463 km^{2} (565 sq mi)

Population (2023)
  - Tehsil: 1,746,173
  - Density: 1,194/km^{2} (3,091/sq mi)
  - Urban: 931,973 (53.37%)
  - Rural: 814,200 (46.63%)

Literacy (2023)
  - Literacy rate: 82.48%
- Time zone: UTC+5 (PST)
  - Summer (DST): UTC+6 (PDT)
- Website: www.tmagujrat.com

Gujrat Tehsil (Urdu: تحصیل گجرات) is a tehsil of Gujrat District, Punjab, Pakistan.

== Demographics ==
=== Population ===
Historical population
Year	Pop.	±% p.a.
1951	396,502	—
1961	433,340	+0.89%
1972	624,917	+3.38%
1981	745,394	+1.98%
1998	1,093,088	+2.28%
2017	1,497,706	+1.67%
2023	1,746,173	+2.59%

As of the 2023 census, Gujrat Tehsil has population of 1,746,173.

== Area politicians ==
Tehsil Gujrat is home to such local politicians such as Haji Imran Zafar - Member, Provincial Assembly of Punjab (2013–2018)
