= Gujrat District =

District in Punjab, Pakistan

Coordinates: 32°35′N 73°45′E

Gujrat ضلع گجرات
- District
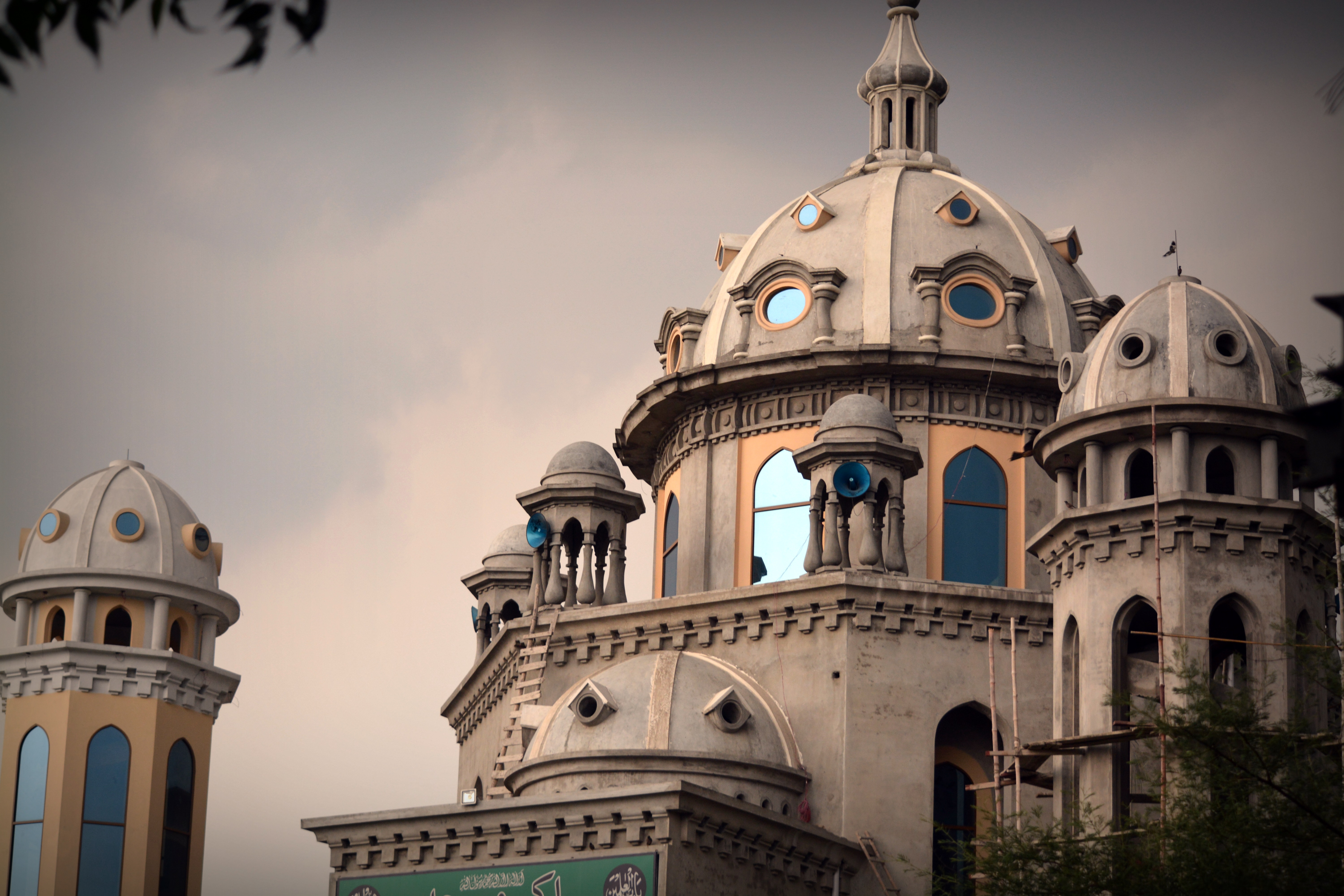
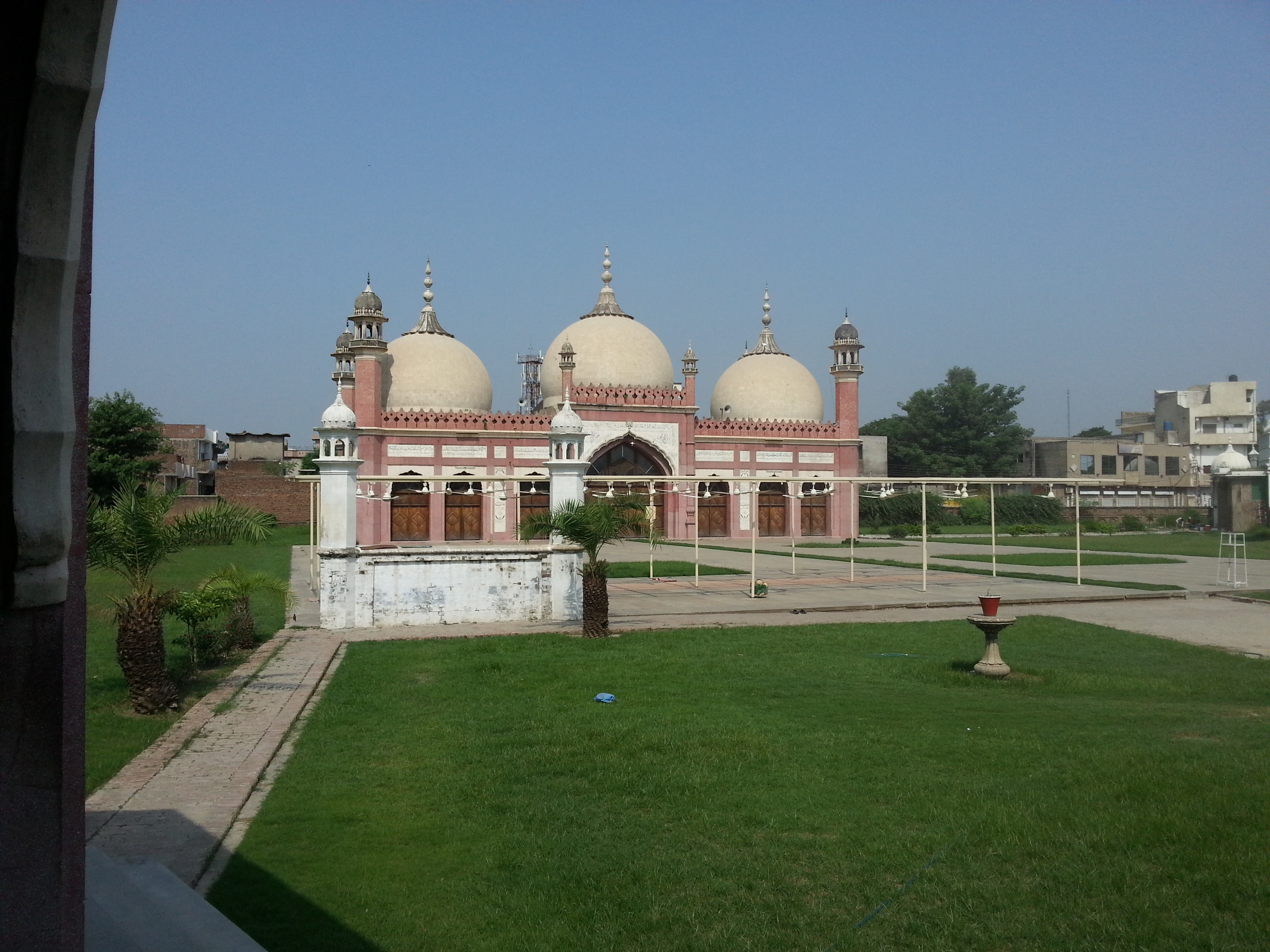
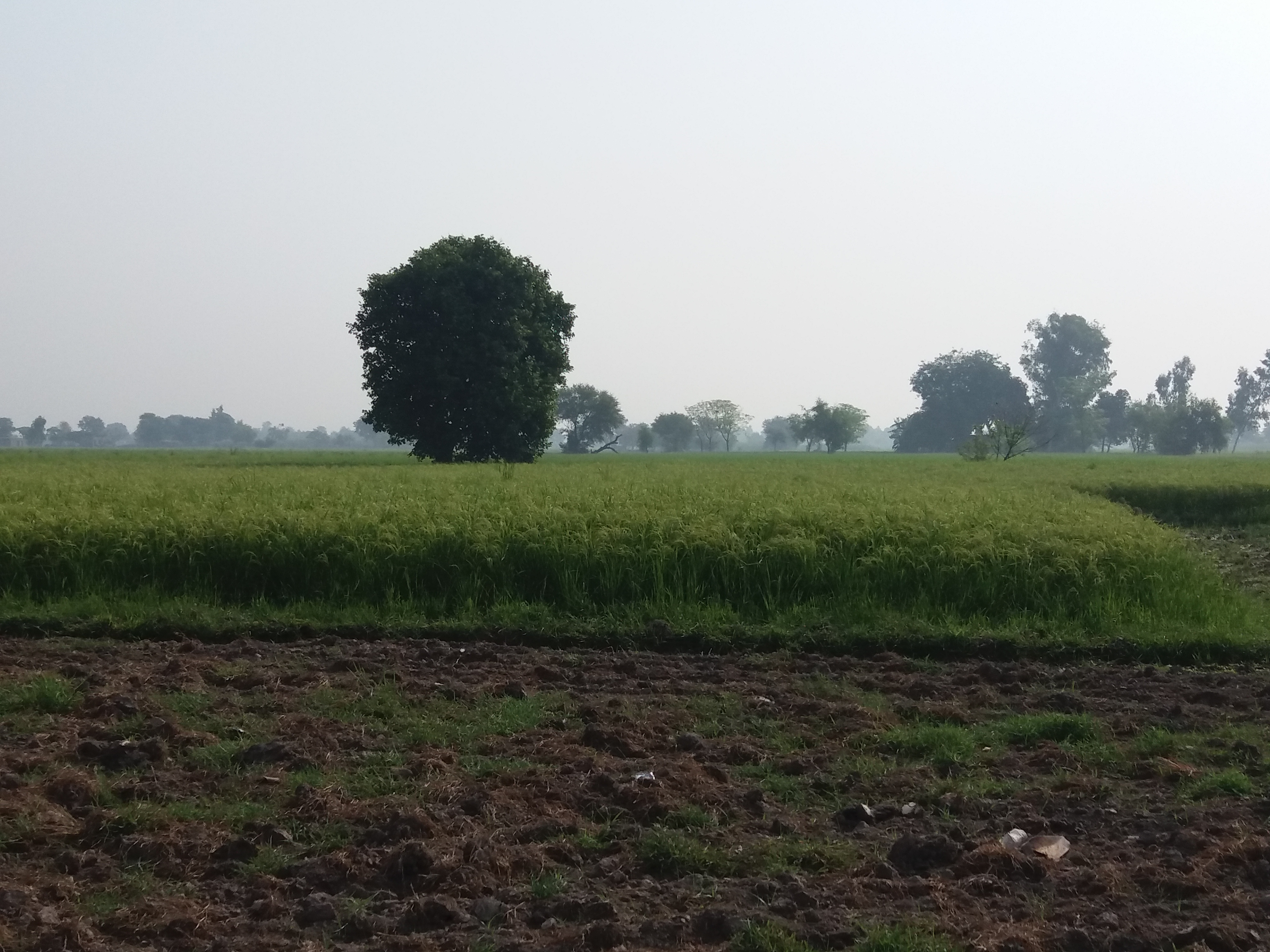
- Top: Mosque in the city of Gujrat; Bottom Left: Gujrat Eidgah; Bottom Right: Rice fields in Chakrian

- Map of Gujrat District in Punjab
- Country: Pakistan
- Province: Punjab
- Division: Gujrat Division
- Established: 1846; 180 years ago
- Founded by: British Raj
- Headquarters: Gujrat
- Administrative Subdivisions: 04: Gujrat Tehsil Kharian Tehsil Sarai Alamgir Tehsil Jalalpur Jattan Tehsil

Government
  - Type: District Administration
  - Deputy Commissioner: Nur-ul-Ain Qureshi
  - District Police Officer: Rana Umar Farooq
  - Constituensy: NA-62 Gujrat-I; NA-63 Gujrat-II; NA-64 Gujrat-III; NA-65 Gujrat-IV

Area
  - District: 3,192 km^{2} (1,232 sq mi)

Population (2023)
  - District: 3,219,375
  - Density: 1,009/km^{2} (2,612/sq mi)
  - Urban: 1,324,264 (41.13%)
  - Rural: 1,895,111 (58.87%)

Literacy
  - Literacy rate: Total: (81.37%); Male: (84.81%); Female: (77.95%)
- Time zone: UTC+5 (PST)
- Area code: 053
- Main language(s): Punjabi, Urdu
- Website: https://gujrat.punjab.gov.pk/

Gujrat (Punjabi, Urdu: ضلع گجرات) is a district of Gujrat Division in the Pakistani province of Punjab. The Gujrat District was created by the British Government in 1846. According to the 2023 Pakistani census, the population of the Gujrat District is 3,219,375.

== Geographics ==
It is bounded on the northeast by Bhimber district, on the north by Mirpur district, on the northwest by the River Jhelum, which separates it from Jhelum district, on the east and southeast by the Chenab River, separating it from the districts of Gujranwala and Sialkot, and on the west by Mandi Bahauddin district. Gujrat district is spread over an area of 3,192 square kilometres.

It is geographically located between the Chenab River and Jhelum River and headquartered at the city of Gujrat.

== History ==
=== Ancient history ===
According to the British Imperial Gazetteer:

Gujrat town itself is a place of some antiquity, and the district [a]bounds in ancient sites. The region was conquered by Chandragupta Maurya. It remained under the Mauryas for a few hundred years until shortly after the death of Ashoka in 231, and about forty years later came under the sway of Demetrius the Graeco-Bactrian. The overthrow of the Bactrians by the Parthians in the latter half of the second century brought another change of rulers, and the coins of the Indo-Parthian Maues (c. 120 B. c.), who is known to local tradition as Raja Moga, have been found at Mong. At the end of the first century A. D., i.e. the whole of the Punjab was conquered by the Yueh-chi. For several hundred years nothing is known of the history of the District, except that between 455 and 540 it must have been exposed to the ravages of the White Huns. Dr. Stein holds that the District formed part of the kingdom of Gurjara(Gurjar), which, according to the Rajatarangini, was invaded between 883 and 902 by Shankara Varman of Kashmir, who defeated its king Alakana.

However the foundation of the capital, Gujrat, according to the Ancient Geography of India:

is ascribed to a king named Bachan Pal of whom nothing more is known; and its restoration is attributed to Alakhana, the Maha Raja of Gurjara, who was defeated by Sangkara Varmma between AD 883 and AD 901.

=== Islamic Rule (Ghaznavid, Ghurid, Delhi, Suri, and Mughal Empires) ===
In 997 CE, Mahmud Ghaznavi inherited the Ghaznavid dynasty established by his father Sebuktegin. After defeating the Hindu Shahis, he conquered their kingdom entirely which included the Punjab region of modern-day Pakistan.

After defeating the Ghaznavids, the Ghurids took over the region. They were in turn succeeded by the Sultanates of Delhi.

The Mughal emperor Akbar established Gujrat as a district along with many others when he began consolidating his rule over his vast empire. Jahangir, Akbar's son and successor, in his memoirs records the following information on Gujrat:

At the time when His Majesty Akbar went to Kashmir, a fort had been built on the bank of that river. Having brought to this fort a body of Gujars who had passed their time in the neighbourhood in thieving and highway robbery, he established them here. As it had become the abode of Gujars, he made it a separate pargana, and gave it the name of Gujrat.

Revenue records have been preserved in the families of the hereditary registrars (kanungos), and these exhibit Gujrat as the capital of a district containing 2,592 villages, paying a revenue of 11.6 million. In 1605, the famous Sayyid Abdul Kasim received Gujrat as a fief from Akbar.

In 1707, with Aurangzeb's death, the decline of Mughal power began in the Punjab region. Nadir Shah occupied the Punjab including Gujrat during his invasion of the Mughal Empire in 1739. The area was captured by Punjabi Gakhar tribesmen from near the Rawalpindi area after the invasion.

Gujrat and Punjab as a whole was devastated further from the invasions of the Durrani Afghans (Pashtuns) under Ahmad Shah Durrani between 1748 and 1767. Durrani took direct control over Punjab after Mir Mannu, the Mughal governor of Punjab, died in 1753. Durrani would frequently cross the area for plunder and to fight the newly emerged Sikh Misls.

=== Sikh and British era ===
The Sikhs eventually took over most of northern Punjab after Ahmad Shah Durrani's final invasion in 1767. The Sikhs under Gujjar Singh Bhangi took Gujrat after defeating the local Punjabi Ghakhars under Muqqarab Khan.

In 1798, the Bhangi leader Sahib Singh pledged allegiance to the Sukerchakia Misl of Ranjit Singh. By 1810, Ranjit Singh's armies captured the city from Bhangi forces, thereby extending the rule of the Sikh Empire to the city.

The Sikh empire declined following Ranjit Singh's death in 1839. The British East India Company defeated the Sikhs between 1845 and 1846 during the First Anglo-Sikh War, reducing their power significantly. Two years later, the empire collapsed after the British EIC again decisively defeated the Sikhs at the Battle of Gujrat, thus ending the Second Anglo-Sikh War. The Sikh empire was entirely annexed and incorporated into the rule of the British EIC. Gujrat district was annexed by the British from its former Sikh rulers after the Second Anglo-Sikh War of 1848–1849.

== Demographics ==
Historical population
Year	Pop.	±% p.a.
1951	742,892	—
1961	835,045	+1.18%
1972	1,177,345	+3.17%
1981	1,408,585	+2.01%
1998	2,048,008	+2.23%
2017	2,756,289	+1.58%
2023	3,219,375	+2.62%

As of the 2023 census, Gujrat district has 489,337 households and a population of 3,219,375. The district has a sex ratio of 99.83 males to 100 females and a literacy rate of 81.37%: 84.81% for males and 77.95% for females. 717,826 (22.32% of the surveyed population) are under 10 years of age. 1,324,264 (41.13%) live in urban areas.

=== Religion ===
Religion in Gujrat district (2023)
Religion	Percent
Islam	98.92%
Christianity	0.95%
Other	0.13%

As per the 2023 census, Islam is the dominant religion with 98.92% of the population while there is a minority of 0.95% Christians who live mainly in urban areas.

Religion in contemporary Gujrat District
Religious group	1941		2017		2023	
Religious group	Pop.	%	Pop.	%	Pop.	%
Islam	622,902	88.12%	2,730,946	99.08%	3,181,322	98.92%
Hinduism (Note: 1931-1941: Including Ad-Dharmis)	45,802	6.48%	120	0%	217	0.01%
Sikhism	36,055	5.10%	—N/a	—N/a	38	~0%
Christianity	2,070	0.29%	21,117	0.77%	30,485	0.95%
Ahmadi (Note: Were classified as Muslims prior to 1974)	—N/a	—N/a	4,007	0.15%	3,825	0.12%
Others	36	0.01%	99	0%	113	~0%
Total Population	706,865	100%	2,756,289	100%	3,216,000	100%
Note: 1941 census data is for Gujrat and Kharian tehsils of erstwhile Gujrat district, which roughly correspond to contemporary Gujrat district. District and tehsil borders have changed since 1941.

Religious groups in Gujrat District (British Punjab province era)
Religious group	1881		1891		1901		1911		1921		1931		1941	
Religious group	Pop.	%	Pop.	%	Pop.	%	Pop.	%	Pop.	%	Pop.	%	Pop.	%
Islam	607,525	88.16%	669,347	87.97%	655,838	87.38%	650,893	87.29%	709,684	86.12%	786,750	85.29%	945,609	85.58%
Hinduism	72,450	10.51%	72,394	9.51%	69,346	9.24%	49,430	6.63%	62,529	7.59%	73,356	7.95%	84,643	7.66%
Sikhism	8,885	1.29%	19,018	2.5%	24,893	3.32%	44,693	5.99%	49,456	6%	59,188	6.42%	70,233	6.36%
Christianity	255	0.04%	114	0.01%	460	0.06%	570	0.08%	2,373	0.29%	3,097	0.34%	4,449	0.4%
Jainism	0	0%	0	0%	11	0%	48	0.01%	4	0%	32	0%	10	0%
Buddhism	0	0%	0	0%	0	0%	0	0%	0	0%	4	0%	0	0%
Zoroastrianism	0	0%	0	0%	0	0%	0	0%	0	0%	0	0%	0	0%
Judaism	—N/a	—N/a	0	0%	0	0%	0	0%	0	0%	0	0%	0	0%
Others	0	0%	2	0%	0	0%	0	0%	0	0%	0	0%	8	0%
Total population	689,115	100%	760,875	100%	750,548	100%	745,634	100%	824,046	100%	922,427	100%	1,104,952	100%
Note: British Punjab province era district borders are not an exact match in the present-day due to various bifurcations to district borders — which since created new districts — throughout the historic Punjab Province region during the post-independence era that have taken into account population increases.

Religion in the Tehsils of Gujrat District (1921)
Tehsil	Islam		Hinduism		Sikhism		Christianity		Jainism		Others (Note: Including Buddhism, Zoroastrianism, Judaism, Tribals, others, or not stated)		Total	
Tehsil	Pop.	%	Pop.	%	Pop.	%	Pop.	%	Pop.	%	Pop.	%	Pop.	%
Gujrat Tehsil	255,252	86.36%	26,209	8.87%	13,241	4.48%	845	0.29%	4	0%	0	0%	295,551	100%
Kharian Tehsil	224,020	89.54%	12,608	5.04%	13,270	5.3%	303	0.12%	0	0%	0	0%	250,201	100%
Phalia Tehsil	230,412	82.79%	23,712	8.52%	22,945	8.24%	1,225	0.44%	0	0%	0	0%	278,294	100%
Note: British Punjab province era tehsil borders are not an exact match in the present-day due to various bifurcations to tehsil borders — which since created new tehsils — throughout the historic Punjab Province region during the post-independence era that have taken into account population increases.

Religion in the Tehsils of Gujrat District (1941)
Tehsil	Islam		Hinduism		Sikhism		Christianity		Jainism		Others (Note: Including Anglo-Indian Christians, British Christians, Buddhism, Zoroastrianism, Judaism, Tribals, others, or not stated)		Total	
Tehsil	Pop.	%	Pop.	%	Pop.	%	Pop.	%	Pop.	%	Pop.	%	Pop.	%
Gujrat Tehsil	331,261	86.96%	29,197	7.66%	18,896	4.96%	1,545	0.41%	10	0%	14	0%	380,923	100%
Kharian Tehsil	291,641	89.48%	16,603	5.09%	17,159	5.26%	525	0.16%	0	0%	14	0%	325,942	100%
Phalia Tehsil	322,707	81.06%	38,843	9.76%	34,178	8.59%	2,321	0.58%	0	0%	38	0.01%	398,087	100%
Note1: British Punjab province era tehsil borders are not an exact match in the present-day due to various bifurcations to tehsil borders — which since created new tehsils — throughout the historic Punjab Province region during the post-independence era that have taken into account population increases. Note2: Tehsil religious breakdown figures for Christianity only includes local Christians, labeled as "Indian Christians" on census. Does not include Anglo-Indian Christians or British Christians, who were classified under "Other" category.

=== Language ===
Languages of Gujrat district (2023)
1. Punjabi (93.5%)
2. Urdu (3.48%)
3. Pashto (2.16%)
4. Others (0.89%)

According to the 2023 Pakistani census, 93.47% of the population spoke Punjabi, 3.48% Urdu and 2.16% Pashto as their first language.

== Administration ==
The district is administratively subdivided into following tehsils:

Tehsil	Area (km^{2})	Pop. (2023)	Density (ppl/km^{2}) (2023)	Literacy rate (2023)	Union Councils
Gujrat	1,463	1,746,173	1,193.56	82.48%	...
Kharian	1,154	1,174,935	1,018.14	79.69%	...
Sarai Alamgir	575	298,267	518.73	81.55	...
Jalalpur Jattan	...	...	...	...	...
Kunjah	...	...	...	...	...

== Education ==
Gujrat district has the 2nd highest literacy rate in Punjab(2023). District Gujrat has a total of 1,475 government schools at primary and secondary level. Out of these public schools, 60 percent (889 schools) are for girls. According to the latest available data, 323,058 students are enrolled in the public schools while 10,581 teachers are working in these schools.

== Notable people ==
=== Politicians ===
- Aitzaz Ahsan, Pakistani barrister, politician
- Fazal Ilahi Chaudhry, President of Pakistan (1972–1977)
- Chaudhry Pervaiz Elahi, politician, former chief minister of Punjab.
- Mian Tariq Mehmood, politician, former MPA, minister
- Chaudhry Zahoor Elahi, politician
- Moonis Elahi, former federal minister, former MPA and MNA
- Chaudhry Muhammed Farooq, former law minister
- Nawabzada Ghazanfar Ali Gul, former Federal Minister of Pakistan
- Mian Muhammad Afzal Hayat, former chief minister of Punjab, former ambassador
- Shujaat Hussain, 16th prime minister of Pakistan (30 June to 28 August 2004)
- Chaudhry Jaffar Iqbal, Vice-President of PML-N Punjab
- Qamar Zaman Kaira, former federal minister of Pakistan
- Mian Imran Masood, former MPA and minister of education Punjab.
- Ahmad Mukhtar, former minister for defence, Government of Pakistan
- Yasmin Qureshi, British MP

=== Scholars ===
- Ismat Beg, scientist
- Faisal Masud, medical doctor

=== Military ===
- Major Muhammad Akram, Nishan-e-Haider
- Major Raja Aziz Bhatti, Nishan-e-Haider
- Mohammad Shariff, former chief of Pakistan Navy and chairman Joint Chiefs of Staff Committee
- General Raheel Sharif, 15th Chief of Army Staff of Pakistan Army
- Major Shabbir Sharif, Nishan-e-Haider
- ACM Zaheer Ahmad Babar, serving Air Chief of Pakistan (Pakistan Air Force).

=== Poets ===
- Orya Maqbool Jan, former civil servant, writer, columnist
- Shareef Kunjahi, Punjabi writer and poet
- Anwar Masood, poet
- Krishna Sobti, Hindi writer
- Fakhar Zaman, writer and poet

=== Sport ===
- Tanwir Afzal, Hong Kong cricketer.
- Imtiaz Bhatti, Pakistani cyclist and former pilot of Pakistan Air Force.
- Mudassar Bukhari, Dutch cricketer.
- Rizwan Cheema, Pakistani-Canadian cricketer.
- Munir Dar, Hong Kong cricketer.
- Ali Warraich, Pakistan kabaddi player.

=== Actors/Actresses ===
- Inayat Hussain Bhatti, film director and actor
- Ejaz Durrani, actor
- Shagufta Ejaz, actress
- Sabiha Khanum, actress

=== Musicians ===
- Adeel Chaudhry, also a dentist, actor, and model
- Alam Lohar, Punjabi folk singer
- Arif Lohar, Punjabi folk singer
- Zoe Viccaji, Pakistani singer-songwriter and musical actress

=== Other ===
- The family of UK-born Shafilea Ahmed, an honour killing victim, originated from Uttam.

== See also ==
- List of populated places in Gujrat District
