= Kharian Tehsil =

Tehsil subdivision in Punjab, Pakistan

Kharian Tehsil تحصیل کھاریاں
- Tehsil
- Interactive map of Kharian Tehsil
- Coordinates: 32°47′15.36″N 73°53′20.04″E
- Country: Pakistan
- Region: (Punjab, Pakistan) Punjab
- District: Gujrat
- Headquarter: Kharian
- Subdivisions: List: 1 Town; 43 Union councils

Government
  - Assistant Commissioner: Faisal Abbas Mangat

Population (2023)
  - Tehsil: 1,174,935
  - Density: 1,018.14/km^{2} (2,637.0/sq mi)
  - Urban: 318,290
  - Rural: 856,645
- Time zone: UTC+5 (PST)
  - Summer (DST): UTC+6 (PDT)

Kharian Tehsil (Punjabi and Urdu: تحصیل کھاریاں) is a tehsil (sub-district) located in Gujrat District, Punjab, Pakistan. The town lies between the Chenab and Jhelum rivers and in the north the foothills of the Pir Panjal mountains.

== Villages and towns of Tehsil Kharian ==
The tehsil, which is headquartered at the city of Kharian, is administratively subdivided into 43 union councils. The list below shows only those settlements in Kharian tehsil with existing Wikipedia articles of their own.

- Amra Kalan
- Achh
- Azam Nagar
- Baddo
- Baharwal
- Barnali
- Basrian
- Bator
- Bazurgwal
- Bhaddar
- Bangial
- Bhago
- Budho Chak
- Bhagwal
- Bhalot Shera
- Bhota
- Bhurch
- Chachian Ranian
- Chakori Sher Ghazi
- Chechian
- Chhimber
- Chiryawala
- Chokar Kalan
- Chak Bakhtawar
- Chakfazal
- Dhakkar
- Dhama
- Dhoria
- Dhunni
- Dilawarpur
- Ghurko
- Golra Hashim
- Guliana
- Gunja
- Haji Chak
- Ismaila Shareef
- Jagal
- Jaurah
- Jhantla
- Jand Sharif
- Kakrali
- Kala Kamala
- Karnana
- Kharian Cantonment
- Kotha Gujjran
- Kotla Haji Shah
- Kotla Arab Ali Khan
- Ladian
- Lalamusa
- Langrial
- Malka
- Mandeer
- Manglia
- Miana Chak
- Mohri Sharif
- Naseera
- Noonanwali
- Panjan Kissana
- Punjwarian
- Paal
- Roulia
- Roperi
- Sabour
- Sadwal Kalan
- Sarsal
- Sehna
- Sidh
- Samrala
- Thikrian
- Thutha Rai Bahadar
- Trerwanwala
- Khori Alam
