= Kala Kamala =

Kala Kamala کالا کملا
- Village
- Location within Pakistan Location within Asia
- Coordinates: 32°35′59″N 73°45′58″E
- Country: Pakistan
- Province: Punjab (Pakistan)
- Division: Gujrat Division
- Köppen climate classification: Humid subtropical climate

Population
  - Estimate (2023): 4,000

Kala Kamala is a village in the Gujrat district of Punjab, Pakistan. It is approximately 88 miles southeast of Islamabad, the capital city of the country. The village was said to have been founded by two brothers, Kala and Kamala, belonging to the Gujjar ethnic group, and stands as a cultural emblem of the Gujjar community's heritage in the region.

Kala is said to have then migrated to Kala Gujran, an area adjacent to Jhelum city, which is possibly named after him. The village remains home to the descendants of Kamala, who continue to inhabit the region and play a substantial role as landowners, carrying on a legacy within the community.

== History ==
The village of Kala Kamala traces its origins to the migration of two brothers, Kala and Kamala, whose precise origins remain unknown. Belonging to the Gujjar ethnic group, specifically affiliated with the Teekriye clan of Gujjars, known for their historical presence in Pakistan, Afghanistan, and northwestern India, these brothers laid the foundations of the village. The Gujjars are traditionally engaged in agricultural, pastoral, and nomadic pursuits.

Following the village's establishment, one of the brothers, Mr. Kala, reportedly migrated to Kala Gujran near Jehlum city. It is speculated that he might have played a pivotal role in founding this subsequent settlement. The lineage of Mr. Kamala's family, one of the village's founding figures, continues to reside in Kala Kamala, preserving their legacy within the community. The village remains a testament to the cultural and historical heritage of the Gujjar community, adapting across time while retaining its foundational roots.

== Economy ==
The village's economy primarily thrives on agriculture, focusing on wheat, rice, and sugarcane cultivation, like in other regions of Pakistan, Punjab. Complementing this, the secondary sector includes buffalo and cow breeding. Four significant milling centers for wheat and rice form the backbone of the agricultural industry, initiated by local landowning families. The first center, established in the early '90s, was followed by three more post-2007, facilitating substantial nationwide trade in these primary products.

The livestock breeding caters to the local demand and that of nearby villages. Moreover, remittances from emigrants in North America, Europe, and Arab countries significantly contribute to the village's economy. This support has led to the prosperity of many residents, with a notable number establishing wealth and settlements in various European countries and North America.

== Demographics ==
The village has a diverse array of ethnic groups, namely the Gujjar ethnic group, who is predominantly the most influential, alongside Qureshi, Faqeer, Qasbi, Mochi, Nai, Machi, and Mussali.

The Gujjars, the predominant ethnic group, are further divided into distinct clans. The Teekriye clan form the majority and are considered the village's founders. Additionally, the community comprises Khatana, who migrated from Ismaila Shareef, Kasana from Noonanwali, Aqle from Bhaugaseet in the Kharian subdistrict, and Miane.

== Services ==
The village hosts a petrol station

== Location ==
Situated approximately 5 km from the city of Dinga, the village is positioned along the Dinga-Mangowal road. It's located within the district of Gujrat, just 30 km away from the district headquarters.

It is approximately 88 miles southeast of Islamabad, the capital city of the country.

== Religious sites ==
=== Baba Noor Shah ===
A revered figure from Panjan Kasana, Baba Noor Shah, a respected Syed, passed away in this village. The people of Kala Kamala constructed a shrine in his honor.

=== Mian Ghulam Ahmed ===
An esteemed elder from the Miane family, his tomb is situated at the village's center. He was regarded as a deeply spiritual individual.

=== Baba Khan Saab ===
Another revered figure, whose shrine is adjacent to the village's graveyard, was known for his spiritual presence. Legend tells of an extraordinary event during a turbulent period when the Hindu Khatris threatened Muslim communities. Baba Khan Saab, seeking protection from Allah, was said to have experienced a miraculous event—where the ground opened up, leading to his descent into the earth, forming a sacred site at that spot.
