= Mohri Sharif =

Village in Punjab, Pakistan

Coordinates: 32°48′N 73°47′E

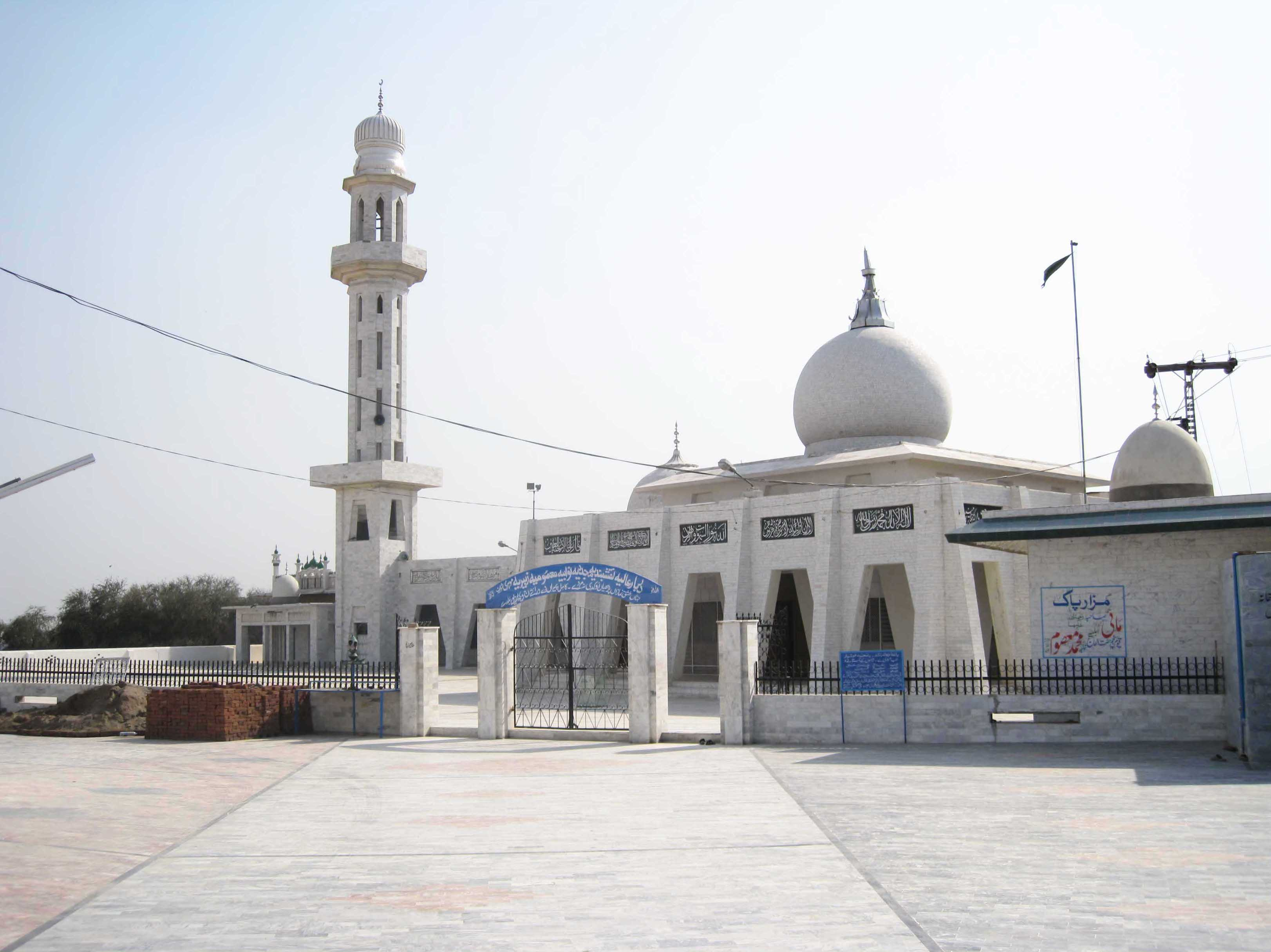
The Mohri Sharif shrine

Mohri Sharif (Urdu موہری شریف) is a village in Tehsil Kharian, in Gujrat District of Punjab, Pakistan. It lies midway between Lahore and Islamabad. The village has a shrine.

== Mosques ==
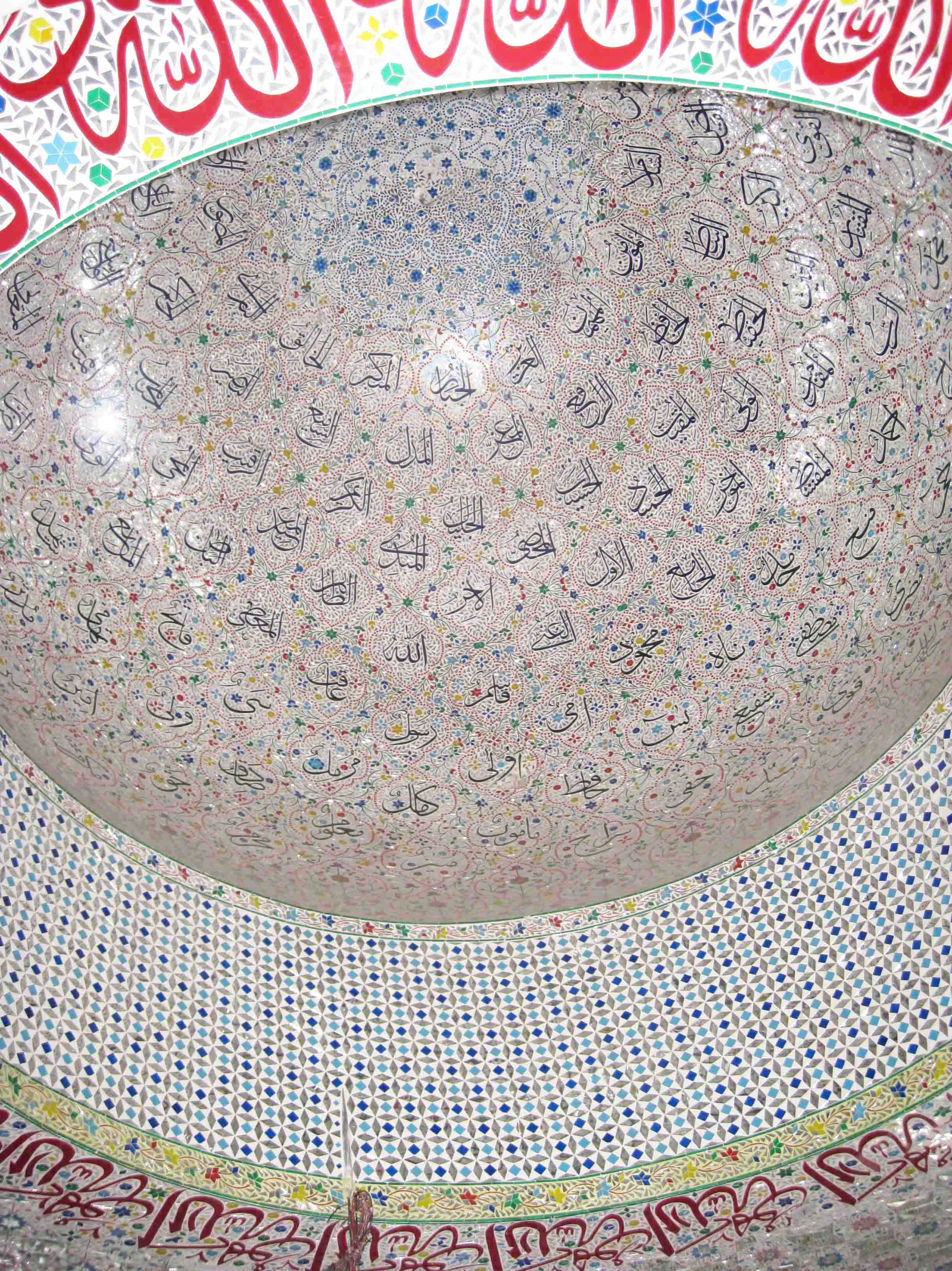

A mosque called Masjid Zareen Zarbakht was built in 1963 and extended in 1989 due to increased pilgrimage. In the middle of the mosque is a dome in which the ninety-nine names of Allah are carved in Mughal-style architecture. The mosque's minaret is 80-foot tall.

Another mosque near the Mohri Sharif shrine is the Shukriya Mosque.

== Langar khana ==
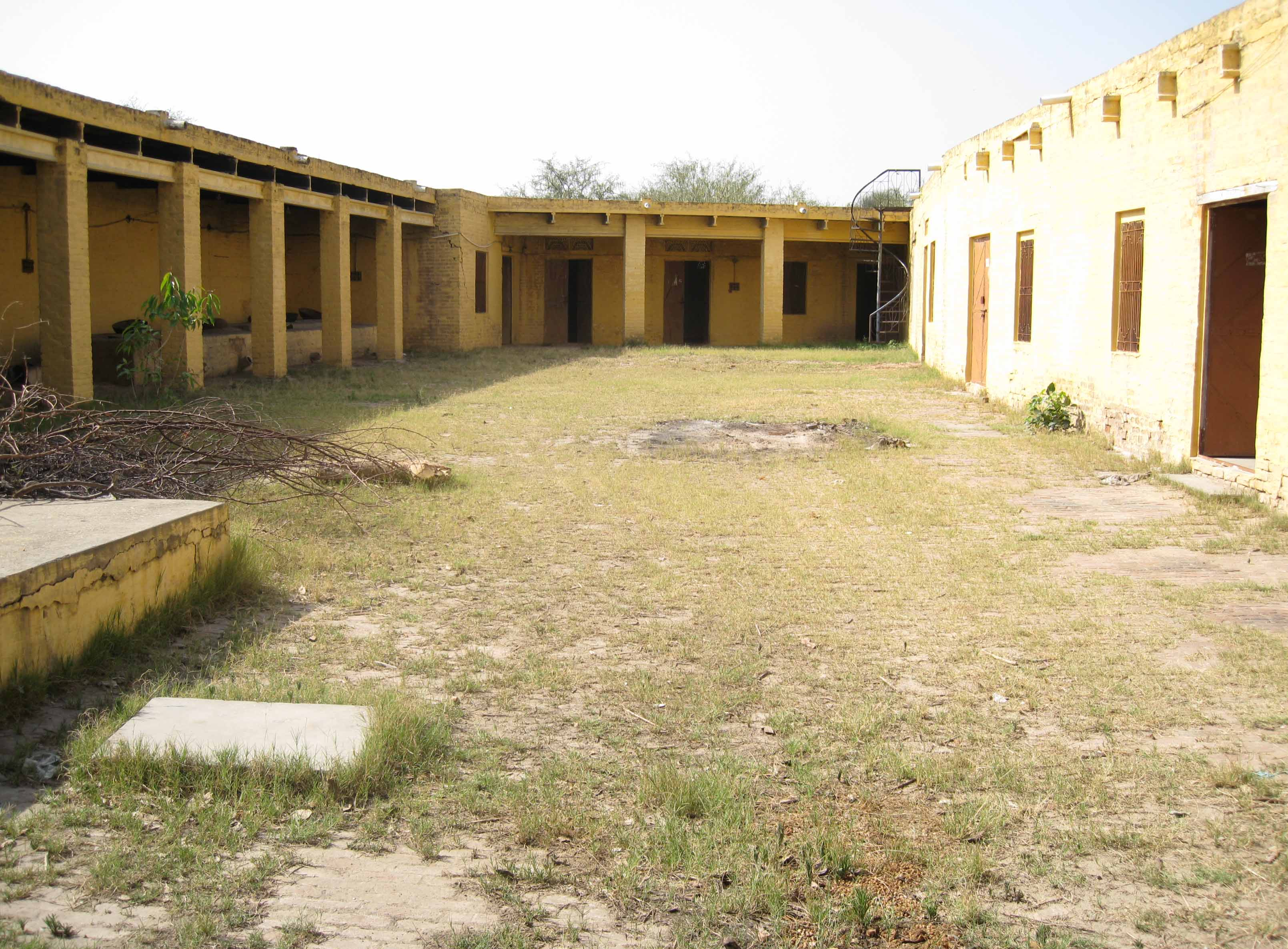

At the Mohri Sharif shrine to handle meals for daily routine and at major events such as annual Urs and congregations a grand langar khana (charity or community kitchen) has been constructed beside the shrine. The facility can prepare meals for 100,000 people simultaneously. The langar khana also has facility for pilgrims to stay overnight in the event of Urs or Milad-un-Nabi congregations.

== Notable people ==
Ismat Beg, Professor, mathematician

== Education ==
- Govt. High School Mohri Sharif
- Govt. Girls High School Mohri Sharif

== Surrounding villages ==
- Choa Rajgan
- Sadwal Chiban
- Mandeer
- Dera Alampur Gondlan
- Kotha Gujjran
- Kalas
- Sanat Pura
- Chak Muhammad
- Damyan
- Dhunni
- Utam
- Dhoria
