= Chakfazal =

Village in Punjab, Pakistan

Chak Fazal چک فضل
- Village
- Location within Pakistan
- Coordinates: 32°52′37″N 74°02′38″E
- Country: Pakistan
- Province: Pakistan
- Division: Gujrat
- District: Gujrat
- Tehsil: Kharian
- Thana: Kakrali

Chakfazal is a village in Kharian, Gujrat in the Punjab province of Pakistan. There are approximately 200 to 250 houses. Mostly cast of population is Jat and clan is Babbar. Its population is approximately 1500. It is situated 25 km from Kharian and 30 km from district Administration Gujrat. Where as 19km far from Bhimber Azad Kashmir. The nearest town, Kotla Arab Ali Khan, is 5 km away. The village lies between the rivers of Chenab and Jhelum, and in the north, the foothills of the mountains of Pir Panjal. The village has a rich agricultural land, where wheat, bajra, corns, sesame, mustard greens (sarsu ka saag) and other crops are grown. The village also has a primary schools for boys and girs, two mosque, two graveyard. Religion of people is Islam and most of the people are Sunny. The village has a cricket team, a football team, and a volleyball team, which participate in local tournaments and matches. The village also celebrates various occasions, such as Eid, Eid Milad Un Nabi, Independence Day, and others, with zeal and enthusiasm. The village has a strong sense of community and solidarity, where people help each other in times of need and joy, specially when some one dies in any house, all houses in village financially contribute a fix amount to said house for support. The speaking language is Punjabi. Chakfazal is a village that represents the rural life of Punjab, Pakistan.

== Surrounding town & villages ==
There are many other villages around Chakfazal, Detail is as under:

- East: Kotla Arab Ali Khan ,
- West: Goteriala, Sadwalcity
- North: Japur, Murarian
- South: Parlay Kithay, Sarria, Mathana Chak, Sheikpur,

== Satellite view ==
Satellite Map by wiki kalu chak kanian
