= Pir Jand =

- Village/Union Council jourah
- Peer Jand
- Nickname: Jand
- Position in Pakistan
- Coordinates: 32°39′35″N 73°52′00″E
- Country: Pakistan
- Province: Punjab
- District: Gujrat
- Tehsil: Kharian
- Division: Gujrat
- Elevation: 233 m (764 ft)
- Demonym: Jandian

Languages
  - Local/Provincial: Punjabi
- Time zone: UTC+5 (PK.ST)
- Postal code: 50700
- Calling code: 053
- Vehicle registration: GT
- Number of union councils: 1
- HDI: 1
- Website: http://punjab.gov.pk/

Pir Jand is a village in the Gujrat District of Kharian Tehsil, Punjab Province, Pakistan. The union council is Juara. The village is on the Lalamusa-Sargodha railway line and Lalamusa Dinga Road, 16 km west of Lalamusa. The population is approximately 3,500, and consists of people from the Gujjar caste.
