= Jagal, Pakistan =

Jagal جاگل
- Village
- Location in Punjab, Pakistan
- Coordinates: 32°49′45″N 74°08′04″E
- Country: Pakistan
- Province: Punjab
- Region/Division: Gujrat
- District: Gujrat
- Tehsil: Kharian
- Union Council: Dilawar-Pur
- Time zone: UTC+5 (PST)
- Postal Code: 50991
- Area code: 053

Jagal (Urdu: جاگل) is a village in Gujrat District, in the Punjab province of Pakistan. The village is situated about 6 kilometres (4 mi) east of Kotla Arab Ali Khan. The village is 38 kilometres (24 mi) from Gujrat city and about 30 kilometres (19 mi) from Kharian city. Jagal is part of a union council named after the nearby village Dilawarpur, which is 2 kilometres (1 mi) to the east. The border of Azad Kashmir lies approximately 10 kilometres (6.2 mi) north of the village. Jagal is also the name of a Gujjar sub-cast. They started to live here around the 15th century.

== Picture gallery ==
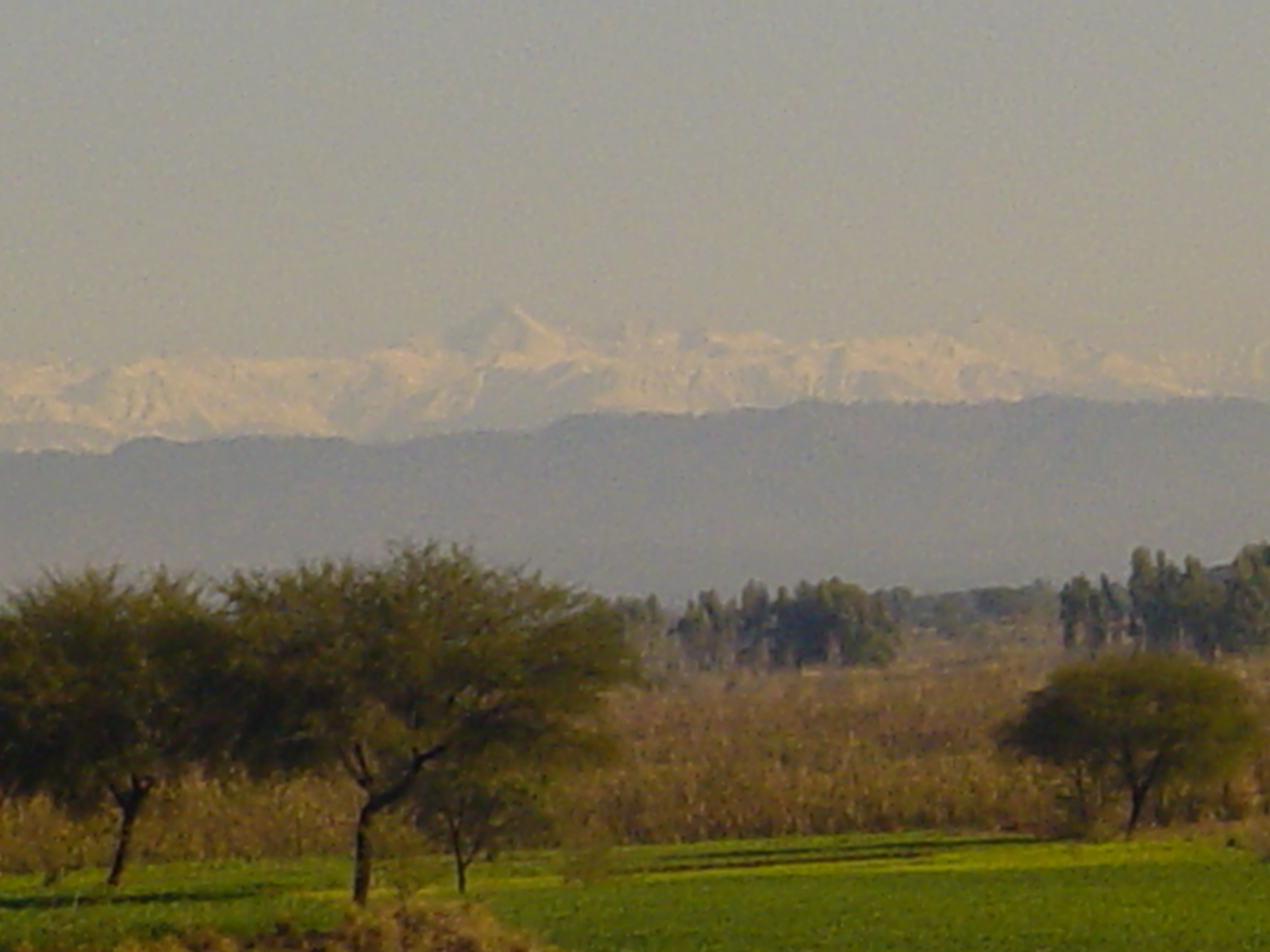
Hills in the distance seen from Jagal

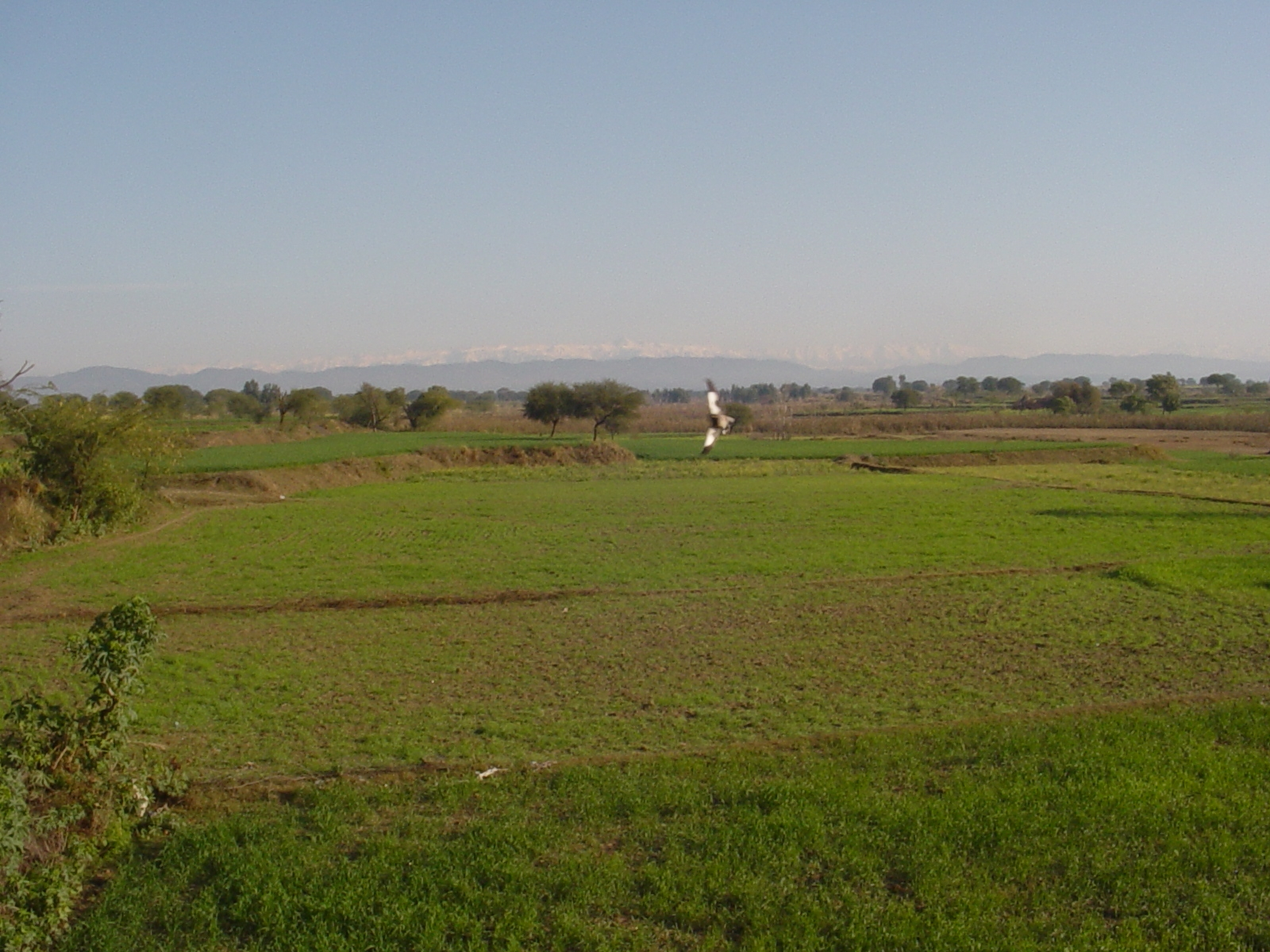
View from Jagal

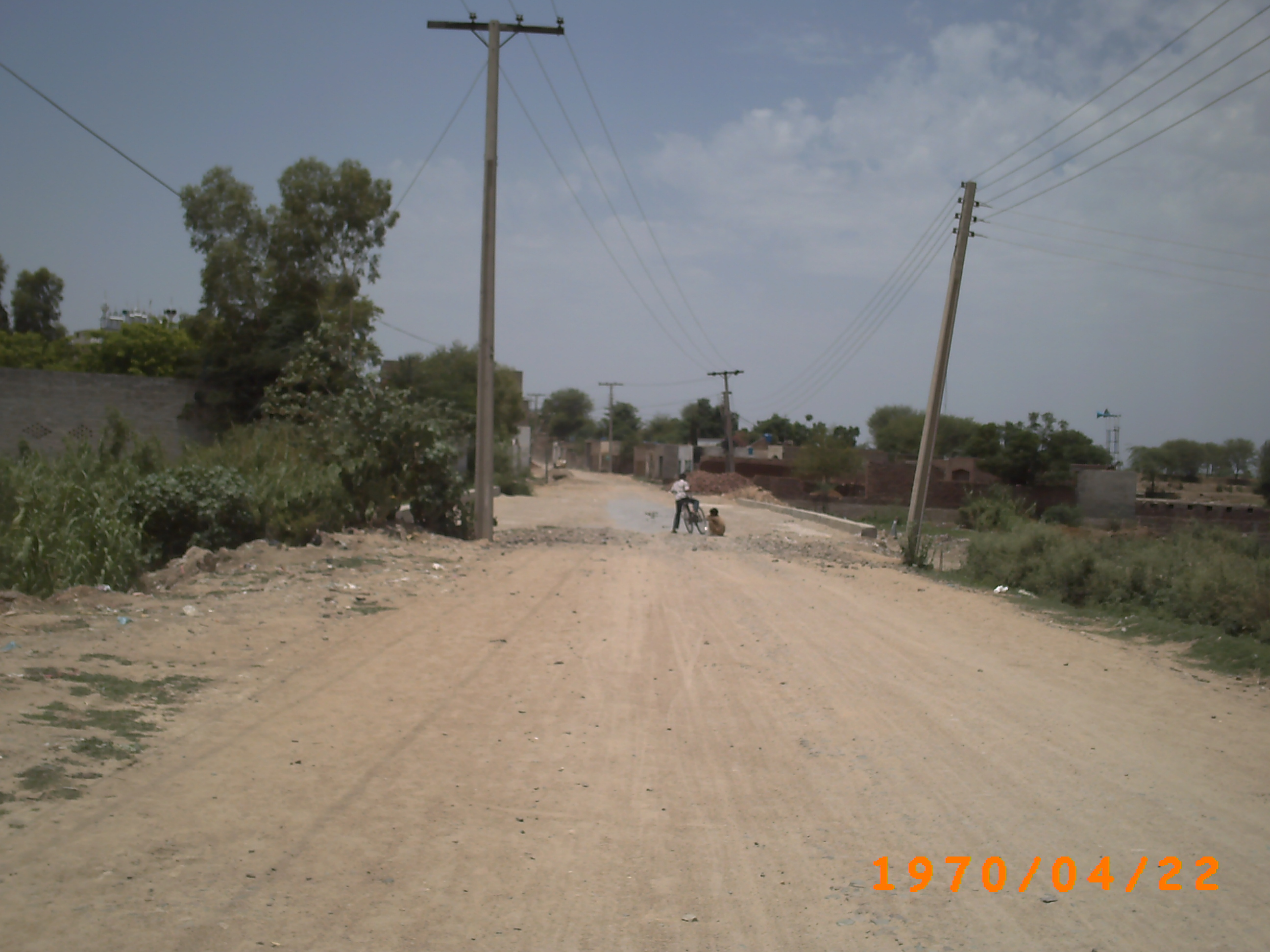
Road under construction

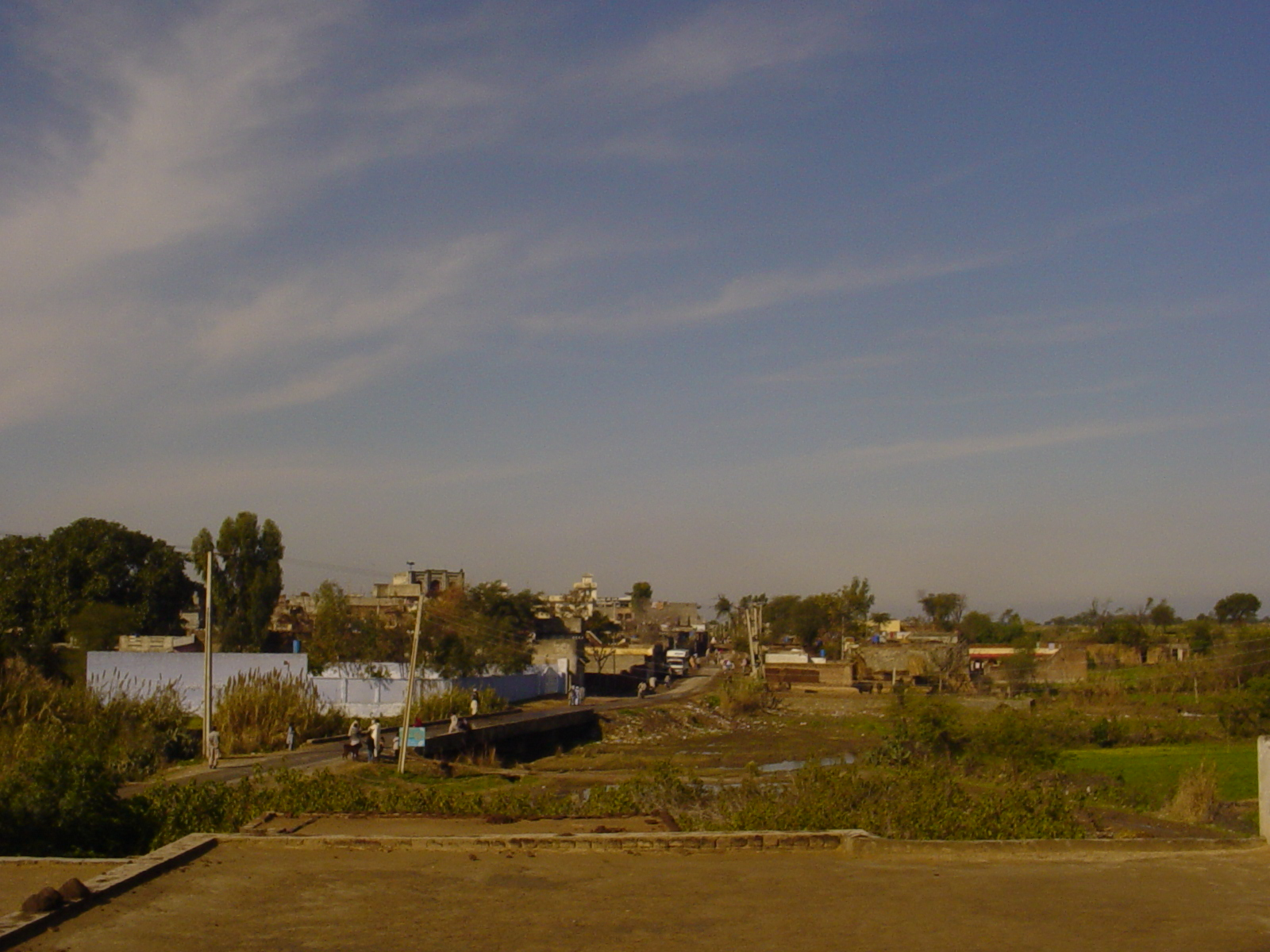
Jagal view
