= Samrala, Gujrat =

Village in District Gujrat Punjab Pakistan

Samrala سمرالہ
- Village
- Location in Gujrat, Punjab, Pakistan
- Coordinates: 32°49′17″N 74°04′25″E
- Country: Pakistan
- Province: Punjab
- Division: Gujrat
- District: Gujrat
- Tehsil: Kharian
- Police Station: Kakrali

Samrala Sharif is a village in Gujrat District in the Punjab province of Pakistan. It is 5 km south of Kotla Arab Ali Khan and 35 km from the city of Gujrat.

There are various stories about history of the village that date back to 15th century, but it is most commonly acknowledged that the village is located roughly 700m from where it originally was. After a flood, it was moved to its current location. The literacy rate is very high and the village is well-facilitated with schools, shops, post offices and roads from Gujrat-Bhimber.
