= Trerwanwala =

Pakistani village

Coordinates: 32°39′N 73°47′E

Trerwanwala is a village of Kharian Tehsil, Gujrat District, in the Punjab province of Pakistan. The village is located on the road connecting Dinga and Lalamusa. Farming is the main source of income within the village. Many residents have settled abroad, mainly in the UK or elsewhere in Europe. Its neighbouring village is Dhndhala.
