= Naseera =

Place in Punjab, Pakistan

Coordinates: 32°48′21″N 73°54′43″E

Naseera نصیرہ
- Town
- Interactive map of Naseera
- Country: Pakistan
- Province: Punjab
- Division: Gujrat
- District: Gujrat
- Tehsil: Kharian

Naseera is a small town in the Sehna union council of Kharian city, Gujrat District, Punjab, Pakistan. A natural "Kass" some time "Kassa" Nala flows as a boundary between Kharian Cantt and Naseera. The main families are Rajput who are descendants of the Chib Rajput of Jandi Chontra, [[Baba Shadi Shaheed]]. Other families are Mughals Mirza who trace their lineage to the Mughals of Chakwal and Kashmir.
