= Roperi =

Village in Punjab, Pakistan

Roperi روپیری
- village
- Location in Pakistan map
- Coordinates: 32°50′27″N 74°07′51″E
- Country: Pakistan
- Province: Punjab
- Division: Gujrat
- District: Gujrat
- Tehsil: Kharian
- Time zone: UTC+05:00 (PST)

Roperi is a large village in Tehsil Kharian, District Gujrat, in Pakistan's Punjab province. It is situated approximately five kilometres east of the town of Kotla. Roperi is 38 kilometres from Gujrat and about 30 kilometres from Kharian. The Union Council of Roperi, Aach-Goch, is 3 kilometres to the north. The border of Azad Kashmir is 10 kilometres north of Roperi. Most residents of this village are Jutt/Malik. The main source of income for the villagers are agriculture, dairy production, and small locally owned businesses.
