= Charryawala =

Village in Punjab Pakistan

Charryawala چڑیاولہ
- Village and union council
- Interactive map of Charryawala
- Coordinates: 32°54′21″N 74°04′50″E
- Country: Pakistan
- Province: Punjab
- Division: Gujrat
- District: Gujrat
- Tehsil: Kharian

Charryawala (Punjabi and Urdu: چڑیاولہ; [t͡ʃəɽjaːʋəla]), also spelled Chiryawala, Chiriawala, Chirianwala, or Chiriawala, is a village and union council in the Gujrat District of Punjab, Pakistan. It is located near the town of Kotla Arab Ali Khan and is one of Punjab's closest villages to the boundary with Azad Kashmir.
