= Chhimber =

Chhimber thumbnail
- Village
- Country: Pakistan
- Province: Punjab
- District: Gujrat
- Tehsil: Kharian
- Time zone: UTC+5 (PST)

Chhimber چھمبر is a small village in tehsil Kharian Gujrat District, in Punjab, Pakistan. It is located near the cities of Dinga, Kharian, Mandi Bahauddin, and Jhelum.

This village was partially destroyed around 1836. it was rehabilitated in 1840 and has been continuously inhabited ever since. The vast majority of the people work in the agriculture industry. Chhimber is located on the bank of the Upper Jhelum Canal.
