= Jaurah =

Jaurah جوڑا
- Town and union council
- Interactive map of Jaurah
- Coordinates: 32°40′04″N 73°49′55″E
- Country: Pakistan
- Province: Punjab
- District: Gujrat
- Tehsil: Kharian
- Elevation: 233 m (764 ft)
- Time zone: UTC+5 (PST)

Jaurah is a town and union council of Gujrat District, in the Punjab province of Pakistan. It is part of Kharian Tehsil and located on Dinga-Lalamusa Road.
