= Noonanwali =

Noonawali نونانوالی
- Town and union council
- Location in Punjab, Pakistan Noonawali (Pakistan)
- Coordinates: 32°43′38″N 73°47′40″E
- Country: Pakistan
- Province: Punjab
- Division: Gujrat
- District: Gujrat
- Tehsil: Kharian
- Time zone: UTC+5 (PST)
- 50060: 50060
- Area code: 50060

Noonawali, also spelt Noonanwali, is a town and union council of Gujrat District, in the Punjab province of Pakistan. It is part of Kharian Tehsil. The village is located equidistant between Kharian and Dinga cities. The Union Council of Noonawali also contains Khunnan. Also known as the Model Village for the reforming changes it has undergone in a few years. New road projects, new sewage system, High Schools, Agriculture reform, Hospitals, SUI Gas and many other.

Noonawali is a small town-style village on Kharian Dinga Road. GT Road, which runs from Lahore to Rawalpindi, about 12 kilometers from Noonanwali. Noonanwali is a Union Council, which represents the surrounding villages. There are Government schools for boys and girls here. Moreover, there are also private schools and Madrassah in this village.
