= Khori Alam =

Village in Punjab, Pakistan

Khori Alam is a village in Kharian Tehsil, Gujrat District of Punjab, Pakistan.

== Geography ==
The village lies between the Jhelum River and the Chenab River. It is about 25 kilometres (16 mi) from Kharian, the administrative center of Kharian Tehsil, and 8 kilometres (5.0 mi) from the city of Dinga.

== History ==
In 997 CE, Sultan Mahmud Ghaznavi, took over the Ghaznavid dynasty empire established by his father, Sultan Sebuktegin, In 1005 he conquered the Shahis in Kabul in 1005, and followed it by the conquests of Punjab region. The Delhi Sultanate and later Mughal Empire ruled the region. The Punjab region became predominantly Muslim due to missionary Sufis.

After the decline of the Mughal Empire, the Sikh invaded and occupied Gujrat District.

The predominantly Muslim population supported Muslim League and Pakistan Movement. After the independence of Pakistan in 1947, the minority Hindus and Sikhs migrated to India while the Muslims refugees from India settled down in the Mandi Bahauddin.
