= Dhama =

Coordinates: 32°41′40.35″N 73°57′2.64″E

Dhama دھامہ tama
- Town and union council
- Interactive map of Dhama
- Country: Pakistan
- Province: Punjab
- Division: Gujrat
- District: Gujrat
- Tehsil: Kharian

Population
  - Total: 400
- Time zone: UTC+5 (PST)

Dhama is a village situated in municipal limits of Lalamusa since the Municipal Committee of Lalamusa was established during British rule. The village is part of Gujrat District, in the Punjab province of Pakistan. Dhama Village is a rural settlement in Gujrat District, Punjab, Pakistan, named after an elder from the Gujjar community, Dhama, who played a key role in its establishment. The Gujjars are the founding family and primary landowners, with historical land records confirming their longstanding influence. Over time, Kashmiris and Syeds also settled in the village, contributing to its cultural diversity. Today, the Gujjar community continues to dominate the village's social, economic, and cultural life, preserving the legacy of the village's namesake, elder Dhama (source).
