= Bhago =

- Location within Pakistan
- Coordinates: 32.44°N 73.49°E
- Country: Pakistan
- Province: Punjab (Pakistan)
- Elevation: 240 m (790 ft)
- Time zone: UTC+5 (PST)

Bhago is a village of Kharian Tehsil, Gujrat District in the Punjab province of Pakistan. It is located at 32°44'0N 73°49'0E with an altitude of 240 metres (790 feet). It is situated near Dinga Road, about 10 miles from the city of Kharian. The population of the village is about 5,000. Most of the inhabitants rely on foreign remittances sent by relatives settled abroad and are engaged in agriculture as their occupation. The main crop is wheat. Four roads link Bhago to other villages. Two of them are accessible from Dinga Road. Bhago village has three mosques, a PTCL telephone exchange, school for boys and girls and government hospital.

Lalamusa Municipal Committee former chairman and a Basic Democracy member in the regime of President Ayub Khan, Sheikh Ghulam Sarwar(1924-1984) belonged to this village.
