= Dhoria =

Dhoria دھوریہ
- Village
- Location in Pakistan Dhoria (Pakistan)
- Coordinates: 32°46′02″N 73°49′40″E
- Country: Pakistan
- Province: Punjab
- District: Gujrat
- Tehsil: Kharian

Population
  - Total: about 17,000−25,000
- Time zone: UTC+5 (PST)
- Postal code: 50130
- Area code: 053

Dhoria is a large village of Gujrat District, in the Punjab province of Pakistan. It is part of Kharian Tehsil. Dhoria has many communities – Gujjar, Mughal, Sayed, Jatt, Bhatti and many other castes. Dhoria used to be an agricultural village, but now some persons have switched to business and many have gone abroad for employment or business. Many people from the area have settled abroad in various countries. It is a fairly rich village on the Dinga to Kharian road.
