= Punjwarian =

Pakistani village

Punjwarian پنجوڑیاں
- Village
- Location within Pakistan
- Coordinates: 32.823641°N 73.920100°E
- Country: Pakistan
- Province: Punjab
- Division: Gujrat
- District: Gujrat
- Tehsil: Kharian
- Time zone: UTC+5 (PST)

Punjwarian (Urdu: پنجوڑیاں) is a village situated near Kharian city in the Gujrat District of Punjab, Pakistan. It is located close to Kharian Cantonment, approximately 12 kilometers from the city center. The majority of the village’s population belongs to the Rajput Bhatti tribe.

== Language ==
Punjabi is the primary language spoken by about 98% of the population in Punjwarian, while Urdu, the national language, is also widely understood and spoken throughout the village.

== Facilities ==
- Govt. Primary Schools (for boys)
- Govt. Primary School (for girls)
- Barlas public model school ( co education )

== Castes ==
- Rajput Bhatti
- Durrani
- Jatt
- Malik
- Mughal Barlas

== Religion ==
- Islam almost 100% followers

== Agriculture ==
Most people here are engaged in agriculture, which forms the backbone of the local economy, and most of the land and businesses are owned by the Rajput Bhatti community.

=== Main Crops ===
- Wheat
- Corn
- Rice
- Sugarcane
- Vegetables
- Fruit
- Pearl millet
