= Kotha Gujjran =

Kotha
- Kotha Gujjran
- Location within Pakistan
- Coordinates: 32.811°N 73.865°E
- Country: Pakistan
- Province: Punjab
- District: Gujrat

Population (2023)
  - Total: ca. 2,100
- Time zone: UTC+5 (PST)
- Calling code: 0537

Kotha Gujjran (Urdu: کوٹھا گجراں) is a village in Gujrat District, Punjab province of Pakistan. The village, which has a majority of the Gujjar clan, is located on Mohri Road, approximately 4 kilometers from Kharian city. It is situated among the villages Mohri Sharif, Dera Alampur Gondlan, and Mehmand Chak on Mohri Road, which links these rural settlements to Kharian city.

Most people prior to migration either worked on the land or in the Army. One example of this is Subedar Major Sikander Khan, who was from Kotha Gujjran and served in the Pakistan Army.

Over time, a large portion of the population has migrated to European countries such as Norway, Denmark, Sweden, and the UK.

== Nearby cities ==
The closest cities to Kotha Gujjran are Kharian (4 kilometers), Jhelum (approximately 20 kilometers), Lala Musa (approximately 20 kilometers), Dina, Pakistan (approximately 40 kilometers), and Gujrat (approximately 40 kilometers). Major cities such as Islamabad (approximately 140 kilometers), Lahore (approximately 175 kilometers), Gujranwala (approximately 100 kilometers), Sialkot (approximately 100 kilometers), Faisalabad (approximately 243 kilometers), Multan (approximately 520 kilometers), and Sargodha (approximately 166 kilometers) are also located within driving distance.

== Education ==
- Govt. Primary School

== Nearby villages and towns ==
- Kharian
- Mohri Sharif
- Dera Alam Pur Gondlan
- Mehmand Chak
- Sannat Pura
