= Azam Nagar =

Villaga in Pakistan

Coordinates: 31°14′N 73°59′E

Mohalla Azama Nagar is a Pakistani village near the village of Thikrian and the city of Lalamusa in of Gujrat district of Punjab.
