= Sehna =

Sehna سہنہ
- Town and union council
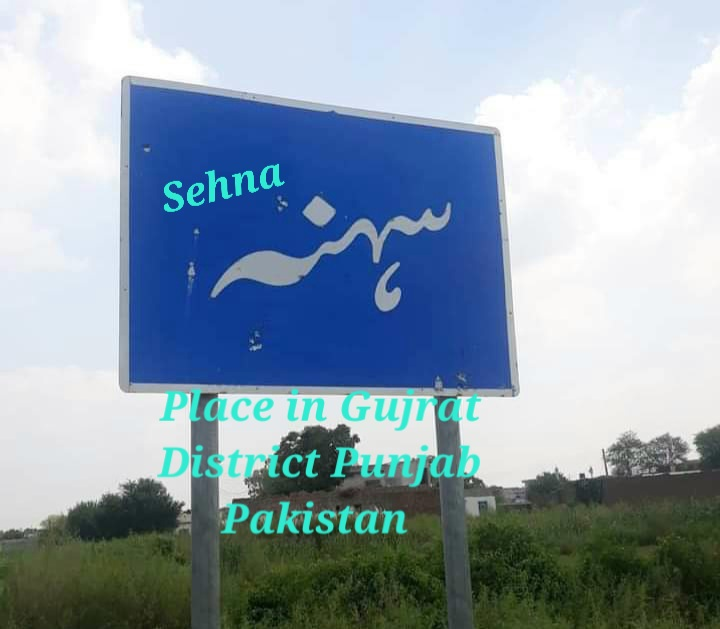

- Location in Pakistan
- Coordinates: 32°48′36″N 73°55′21″E
- Country: Pakistan
- Province: Punjab
- Division: Gujrat
- District: Gujrat
- Tehsil: Kharian
- Union council: Sehna
- Time zone: UTC+5 (PST)
- Postal code: 50150

Sehna is a town and union council of Gujrat District, in the Punjab province of Pakistan. It is part of Kharian Tehsil.

Sehna is a large village, with a government high school each for boys and girls and a primary school. Many residents are well-educated and work in reputable organizations.

Sehna village is predominantly inhabited by people of the Arain caste. The Numberdar position in the village has been held by the same family for generations.
