= Dhakar, Pakistan =

Coordinates: 32°40′25″N 73°45′47″E

Dhakkar is a town of Gujrat District in the Punjab province of Pakistan.

== Facilities ==
There are about 10 mosques and 4 schools in Dhakkar. Many students go to Wisdom House Boys/Girls High School, Degree College for women or Millat High School, which are located in Channan near Dhakkar. A few students go to Kharian Cantonment's prime educational institutes & Govt. Swedish Pakistani collage of technology Gujrat to get quality education. There are also some Doctors in Dhakkar. Unfortunately, no hospital is working in Town, however many hospitals are located in nearby cities of Dinga and Kharian.
