= Kakrali =

Kakrali ککرالی
- Village
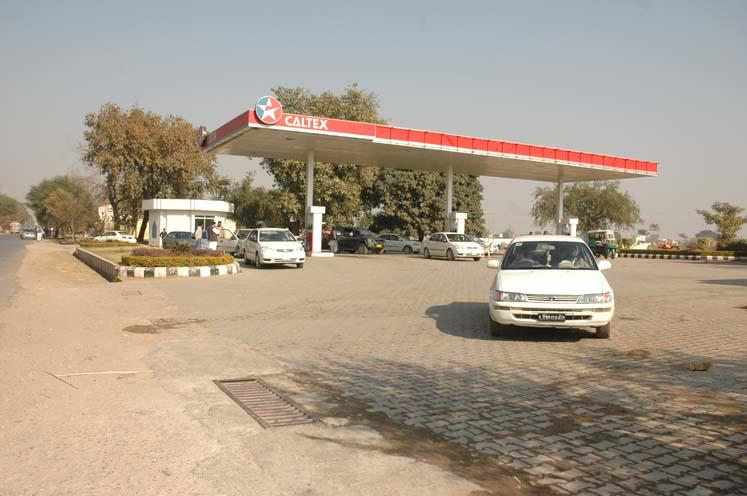
- A petrol pump in Kakrali

- Location within Punjab, Pakistan Location within Pakistan
- Coordinates: 32°50′16″N 74°04′36″E
- Country: Pakistan
- Province: Punjab, Pakistan
- Division: Gujrat
- District: Gujrat
- Tehsil: Kharian
- Time zone: UTC+5 (PST)

Kakrali (Urdu: ککرالی) is a union council of Gujrat District, in the Punjab province of Pakistan.

It is situated on Bhimber Road, approximately 25 kilometers from Kharian and 35 kilometers from Gujrat and comes under Kharian Tehsil of Gujrat District.

== The village ==
The name of the village is derived from the Punjabi word "Kikran Wali" as there were a lot of kikar trees in this area. The majority of the inhabitants are Jats.

The main police station of the area is also located in Kakrali, and controls approximately 20 villages around it. In the early 20th century, the majority of men from Kakrali worked for the British Army.

The land surrounding the village is arid, production of crops is totally dependent on seasonal rainfall. As a result, agriculture has not been the main source of income for the local population. Many of the villagers have gone overseas to find work.

Kakrali has a Hindu temple, located in the main bazar near the Bhandar, a seasonal water stream. The Bhandar starts in the high mountains in northern Pakistan, so its water remains cold even in the summer. Near the Bhander, there is a sports field. This field is used by both children and adults in the summer and winter.

Kakrali has a high school which was established before the Partition of India. The first graduates of this school completed their studies in 1948.

== Neighbouring villages ==
- Sabour Sharif
- Langrial
- Kotla Arab Ali Khan
- Sadwal Kalan
