= Bhaddar =

Bhaddar بھدر
- Location within Pakistan
- Coordinates: 32.7797518°N 73.9915036°E
- Country: Pakistan
- Province: Punjab
- Division: Gujrat
- District: Gujrat
- Tehsil: Kharian

Government
- Elevation: 215 m (705 ft)
- Time zone: UTC+5 (PST)

Bhaddar is a village in Kharian Tehsil, Gujrat District in the Punjab province of Pakistan. It is located at 31° 56' 30N 74° 2' 47E, at an altitude of 215 metres (708 feet). It is also the chief town of Union Council Bhaddar which is an administrative subdivision of the Tehsil.

== History ==
Bhaddar is an old village. There is evidence that it was established in the 14th century. Before the independence of Pakistan in 1947, Muslims, Hindus, and Sikhs used to live here in harmony. There are still the ruins of pre-independence buildings here.

== Demography ==
The population of Bhaddar is estimated to be in excess of 5,000 and consists mainly of the Bhaddar clan of Jatts. The population is 98.21% Muslim majority.
