= Roulia =

Pakistani village

- Village
- Rolia Sharif رولیہ شریف
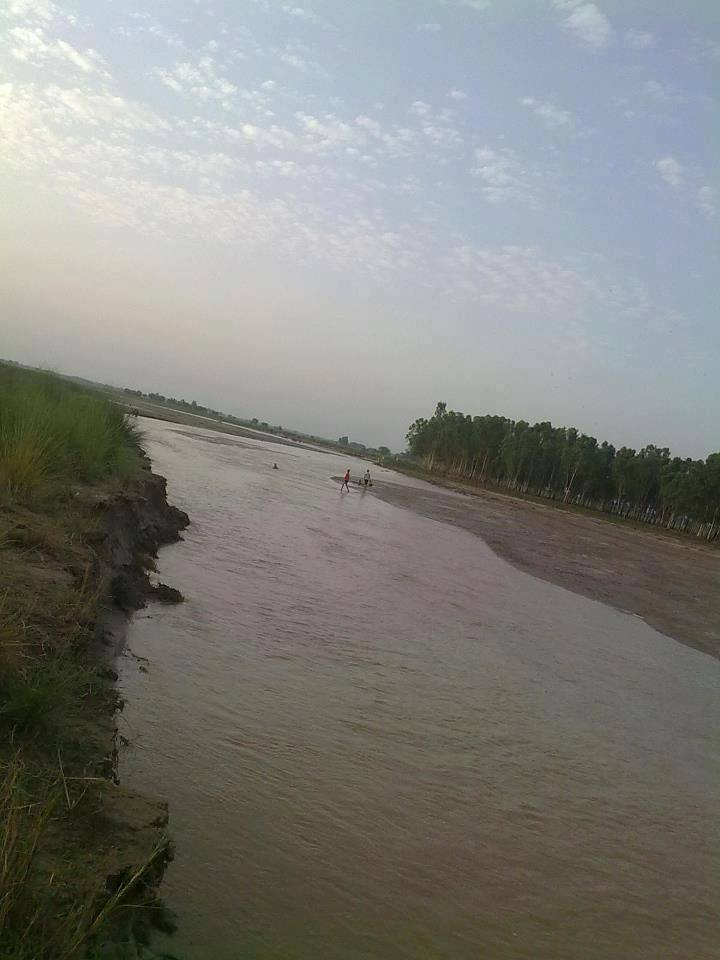
- Nala Bhandar river outside the village

- Location in Pakistan
- Coordinates: 32°47′50″N 74°03′50″E
- Country: Pakistan
- Province: Punjab
- Division: Gujrat
- District: Gujrat
- Tehsil: Kharian

Area
  - Total: 2.70 km^{2} (1.04 sq mi)
- Elevation: 270 m (890 ft)

Population (1998)100% Sunni Muslims
  - Total: 17,915
- Time zone: UTC+5 (PST)
- Calling code: 053

Rolia رولیا is a village in Sabour union council of Gujrat District and Kharian Tehsil in the Punjab province of Pakistan. It is situated on Bhimber Road, 31 kilometres (19 mi) away from Gujrat and 21 kilometres (13 mi) from Bhimber. Sabour and Banian are neighbouring villages.

== Geography ==
Geographically, Roulia is situated on a plain. It is situated between Sabour and Banian Villages alongside Bhimber Road. The Nala Bhandar river flows on the eastern side of the village. Alongside Nala Bhandar there is a small dense forest called Balee. Bhimber Road bisects the village into two halves; on the western side Ladian village is situated, in North Sabour Village is located and in South Banian Village is located.
