= Thikrian =

Coordinates: 32°43′40″N 73°56′0″E

Thikrian ٹھیکریاں
- Town and union council
- Interactive map of Thikrian
- Country: Pakistan
- Province: Punjab
- District: Gujrat
- Tehsil: Kharian
- City: Lalamusa

Government
- Time zone: UTC+5 (PST)
- Area code: 0537

Thikrian is a Pakistani village and union council located on G.T. Road in Lalamusa city of Gujrat District, in the Punjab province. It is part of Kharian Tehsil and is located at 32°43'40N 73°56'0E with an altitude of 254 meters (836 feet).
