= Jagal =

Jagal may refer to:

- JAGAL, a pipeline in Germany
- Jagal, Pakistan, a village in Punjab, Pakistan
- Jagal, the Indonesian title of the film The Act of Killing
