= Dlawarpur =

Village in Punjab, Pakistan

Coordinates: 32°48′20″N 74°09′59″E

Dlawarpur, also spelled Dilawarpur, is a village of Kharian Tehsil, Gujrat District, Punjab, Pakistan. It is a union council of Kharian tehsil and 6 miles (11 km) from Kotla Arab Ali Khan, going east on the Kotla–Jalalpur Sobtian (Nikka Jalalpur) road.
