= Amra Kalan =

Amra Kalan امرہ کلاں
- Village and union council
- Location in Pakistan
- Coordinates: 32°39′55″N 73°40′15″E
- Country: Pakistan
- province: Punjab
- District: Gujrat
- Time zone: UTC+5 (PST)

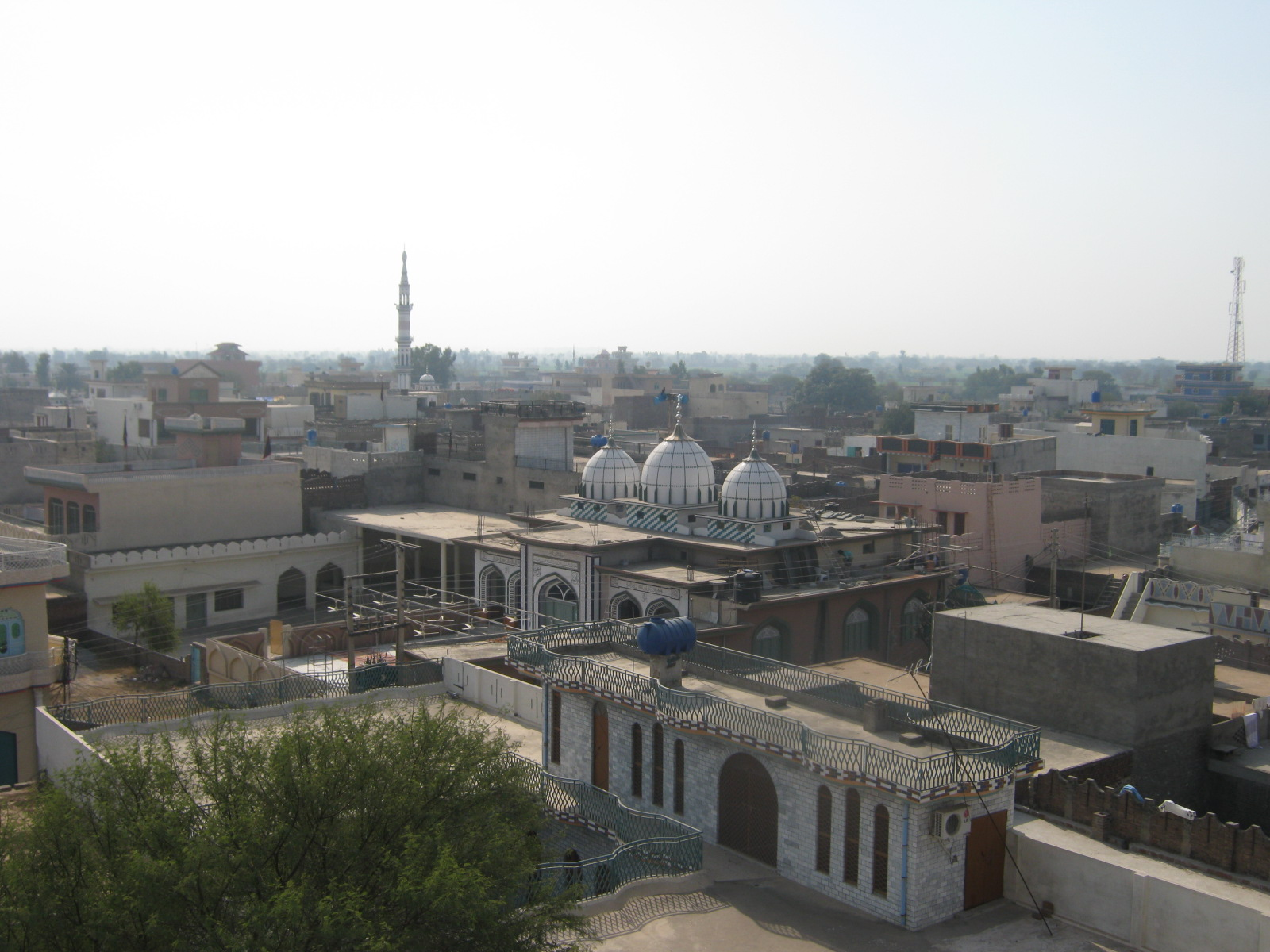
Amra Kalan Village

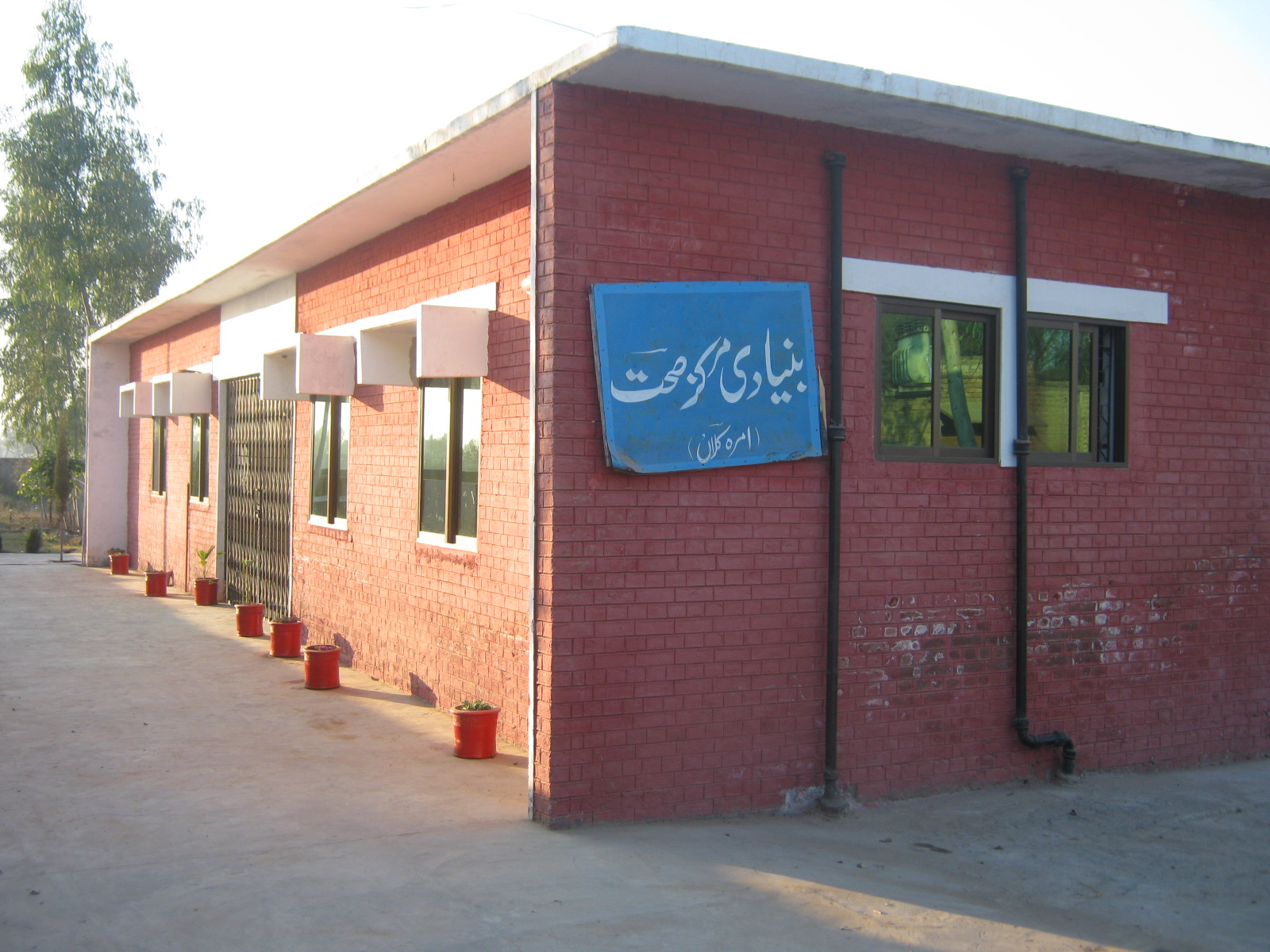
Amra Kalan Hospital

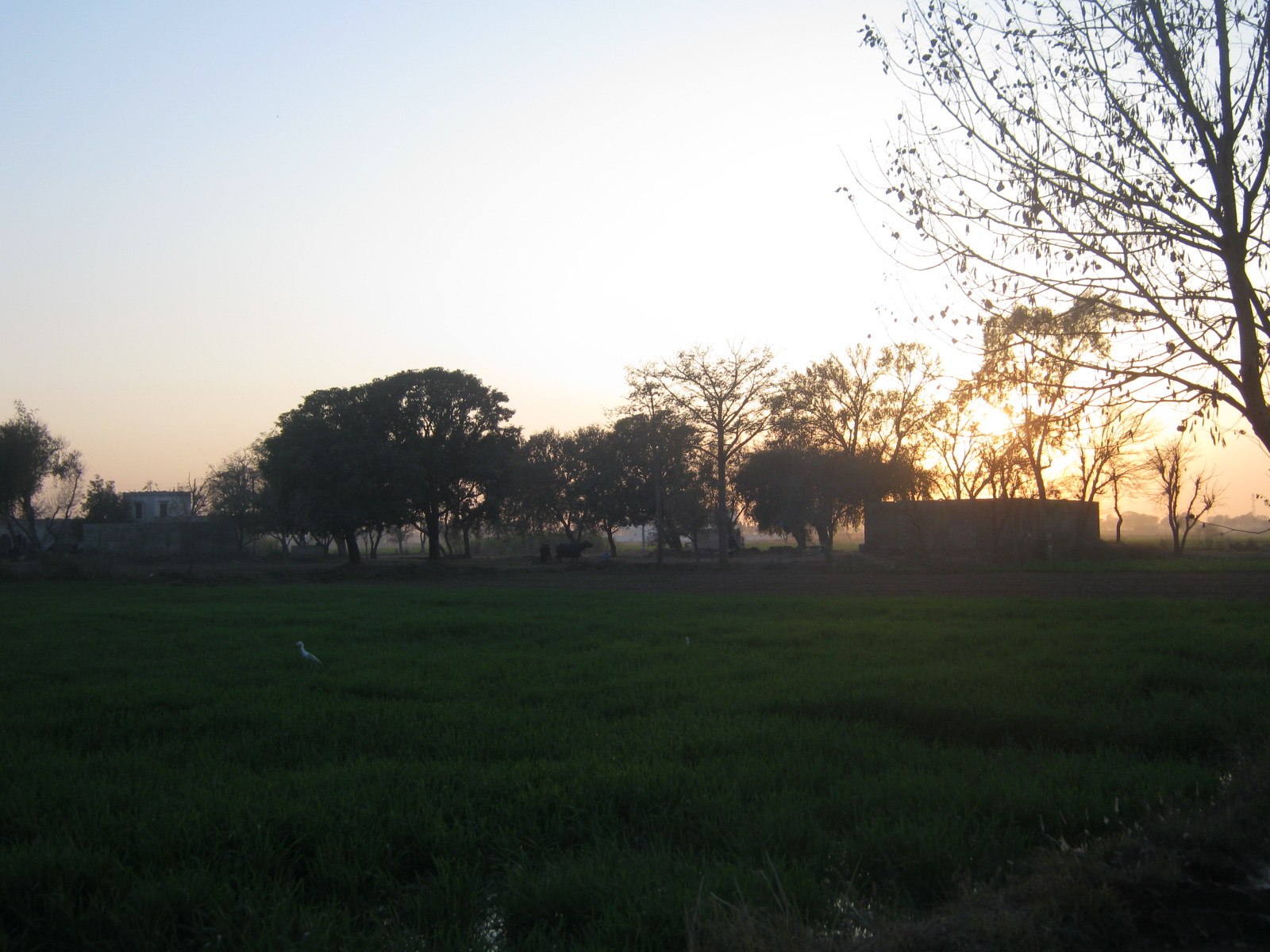
Amra Kalan's peaceful country life

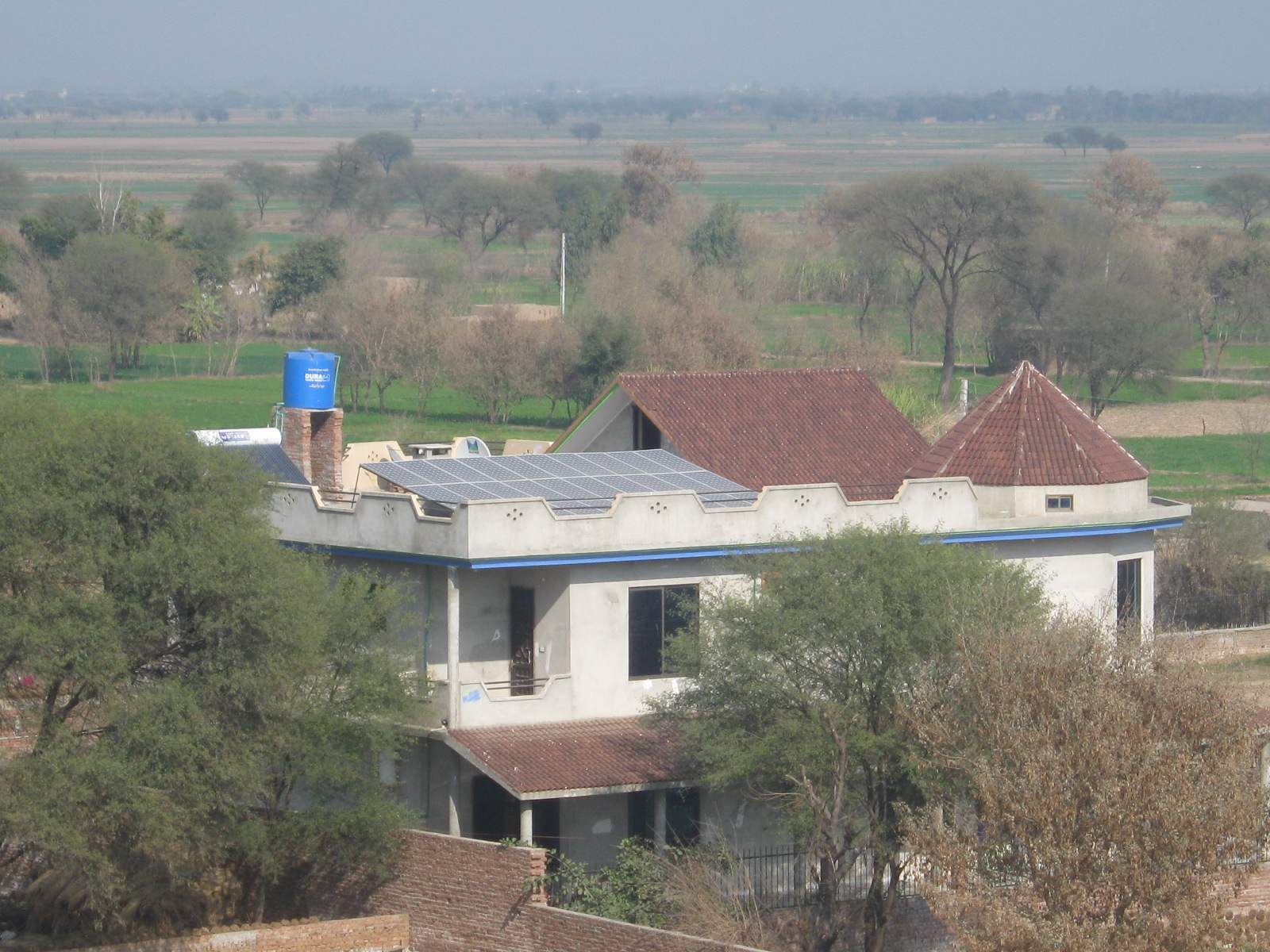
First solar panel system in Amra Kalan with beautiful landscape scenery in the background

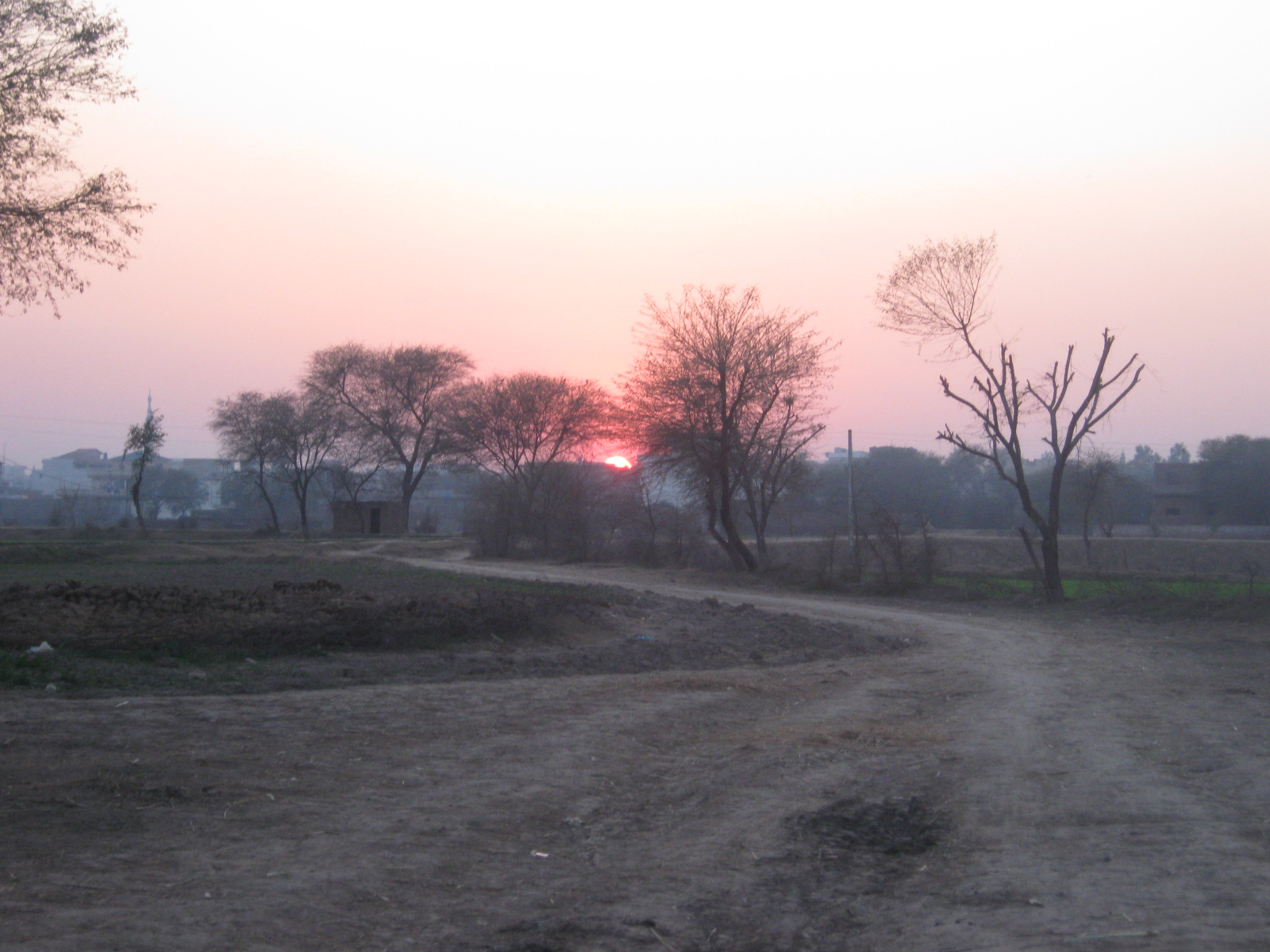
Amra Kalan - Sunset

Amra Kalan is a village and union council of Gujrat District, in the Punjab province of Pakistan. Part of Kharian Tehsil, this village is located at an altitude of 219 metres.

== History ==
Amra Kalan was named after its first settler Amar Khan in the 16th century. The Battle of Chillianwala was fought during the Second Anglo-Sikh War in the nearby villages of Chillianwala and Rasul on 13 January 1849. During the bloody partition in 1947, Sikhs and Hindus migrated from here to India and some of the Muslim refugees who had to migrate from India settled in the village.

Before 1960, people of Amra Kalan largely depended on agriculture. Small land holdings and economic conditions forced people to look for alternatives. From the early 1960s, many inhabitants started migrating to European countries; mainly the United Kingdom, Greece, Holland, Denmark and Norway, to the Middle East in the 1970s and later to USA, Spain and Italy from the 1990s onward. This has brought about an improvement in the economic conditions for majority of the population with better living conditions for many in the village.

== Infrastructure ==
Amra Kalan is in two parts: the main village and the Adda (bus stop). Over the years the Adda has developed into a place of commercial and industrial activity. Amra Kalan is growing into a small town: It has three government schools, hospital, a telephone exchange, a bank, a post office, two graveyards and two self-funded community centres.

The streets are paved and sewerage channels are open but lined. The village is surrounded by fields that are used to harvest rice and wheat in respective seasons.

== Transport ==
Amra Kalan has seventy Rickshaws providing convenient transport to neighbouring villages and to Dinga Town that is approximately 3 miles from the village. There are some tangas (single horse carriages) linking the village and the Adda but their number is on the decline. The Adda provides two taxi bases.

== Religion ==
The village is home to sunni, Sufi and shia Muslims. There are eleven mosques, four holy shrines and one imam bargah. In Amra Kalan there is a shrine of Allama Maulana Molvi Allah Deen and his son Allama Muhammad Azeem ur Rehman.
