= Sarsal =

Village in Punjab, Pakistan

Coordinates: 32°53′N 74°05′E

Sarsal is a village in Gujrat District, Punjab, Pakistan. It is frequently called Sarsala. It is approximately 38 km from Gujrat City, near Kotla Arab Ali Khan, almost at the edge of Punjab's border with Azad Kashmir.

== Demographics ==
The population of the village, according to 2017 census was 3,077.
