= Bataur, Gujrat =

Bator بٹور
- Village
- Location within Pakistan
- Coordinates: 32°46′N 73°58′E
- Country: Pakistan
- Province: Punjab
- District: Gujrat
- Tehsil: Kharian

Area
  - Total: 2.75 km^{2} (1.06 sq mi)
- Elevation: 275 m (902 ft)

Population (1998)100% Suni Muslims
  - Total: 3,526
- Time zone: UTC+5 (PST)
- Favourt game of the village is Kabaddi and Cricket. Kabaddi team of the village is popular in surrounding, Cricket team also won a numders of tournaments of the surrounding villages

Bator is a village in Kharian Tehsil, Gujrat District in the Punjab province of Pakistan. It is located 29 kilometers north of Gujrat city. Bator is part of Union Council Bhaddar which is an administrative subdivision of Kharian Tehsil.

== Demographics ==
Bator's population was 1,891, according to 2017 census.

== History ==
Bator is an ancient village. Before the independence of Pakistan, Hindus and Sikhs also comprised the village population.

== Economy ==
The economy of Bator is diverse, with approximately 30 percent of its adult population working overseas. Other people are farmers, some are government employees, like school teachers, army personnel and a few work in big cities like Karachi and Lahore.
