= Ismaila Shareef =

Village in Punjab, Pakistan

Ismaila Shareef is a large farming village of Kharian Tehsil, Gujrat District, Punjab, Pakistan.

Ismaila Shareef is located on Kharian Road, between the cities of Kharian and Dinga, between 'Head-Rasool Nehar' (A river flowing directly from Kashmir) and 'Saifal' (a small canal running from Head Rasool Nehar). Ismaila Shareef is known within the Gujrat district for shrines of Sufi saints. Most people of Ismaila Shareef belong to the Gujjar tribe.
