= Miana Chak =

Miana Chak میانہ چک
- Town and union council
- Location in Pakistan
- Coordinates: 32°43′10″N 74°07′54″E
- Country: Pakistan
- Province: Punjab
- District: Gujrat
- Time zone: UTC+5 (PST)

Miana Chak is a town of Gujrat District, in the Punjab province of Pakistan. It is part of Gujrat tehsil.
