= Dhunni =

Coordinates: 32°45′08″N 73°48′31″E

Dhunni دھنی
- Village and Union Council
- Interactive map of Dhunni
- Country: Pakistan
- Province: Punjab
- District: Gujrat
- Tehsil: Kharian
- Time zone: UTC+5 (PST)
- Website: https://www.youtube.com/watch?v=sPvzN9ObBIQ

Dhunni is a village in Kharian Tehsil, Gujrat District in the Punjab province of Pakistan. It is part of Kharian Tehsil.

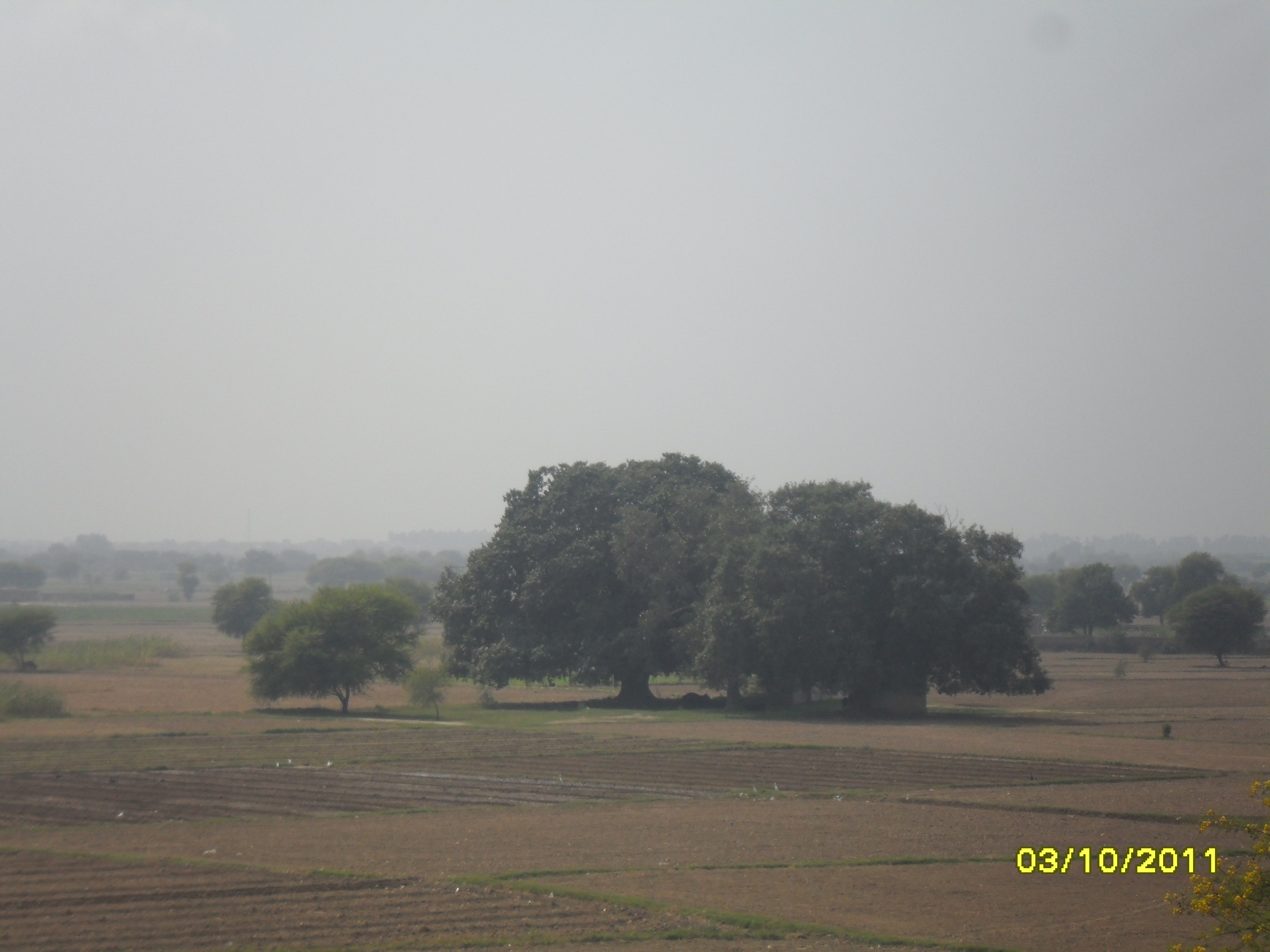
Dhunni village

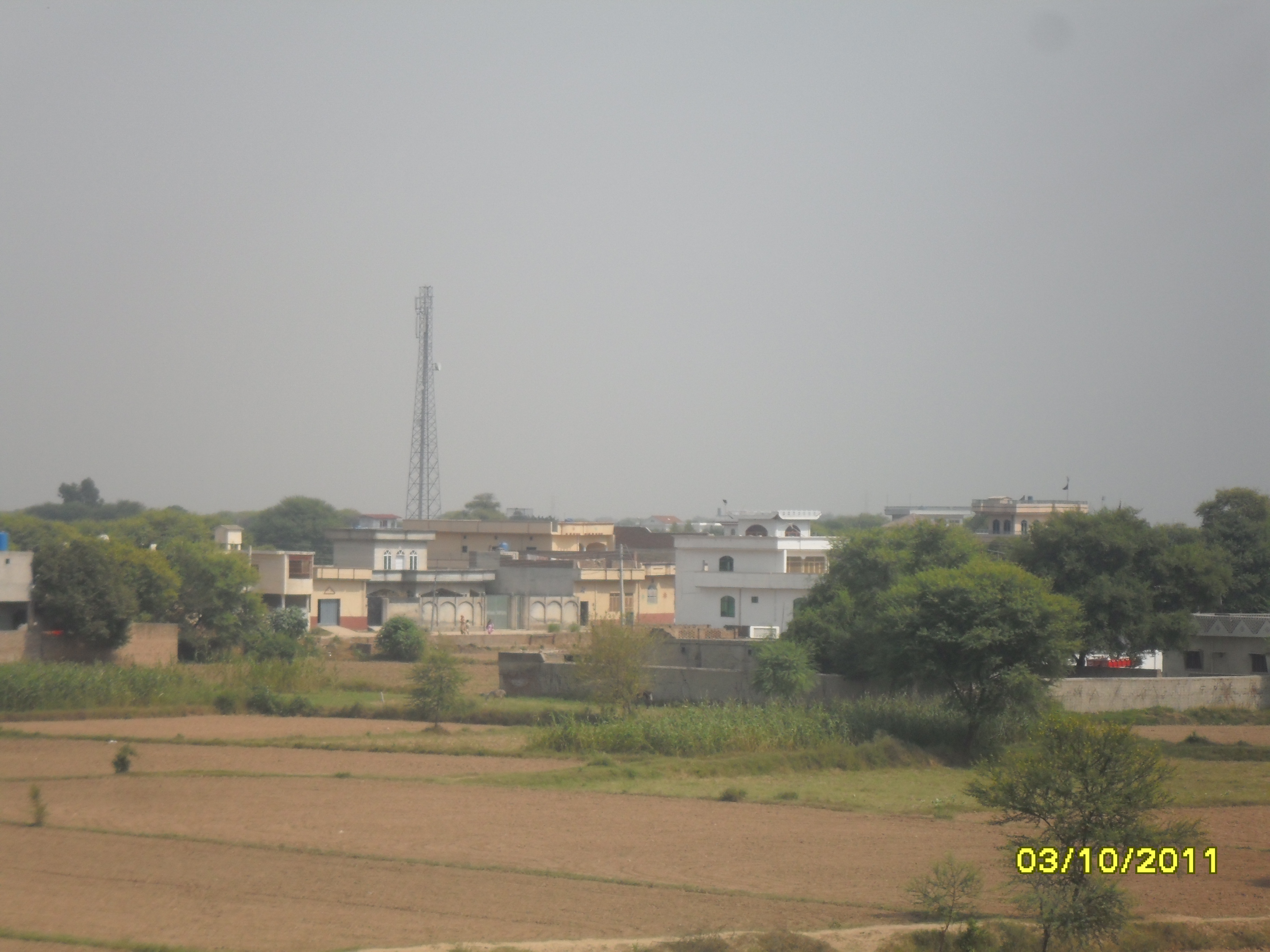
view of Dhunni

As shown in old land registration office documents, the village name is derived from the Punjabi word Dhooni, which literally means to blow fire. There are two other villages named Dhunni. The first is Dhunni at Hafizabad and other is Dhunni Kalan at Mandi Bahauddin. Dhunni is the place of the shrine of Pir of Hujra Shah Muqeem named Pir Imam Ali Shah and Pir Mubarak Ali Shah. Also known as Dam Meeram Lal Pak Bahawal Sher Qalandar.

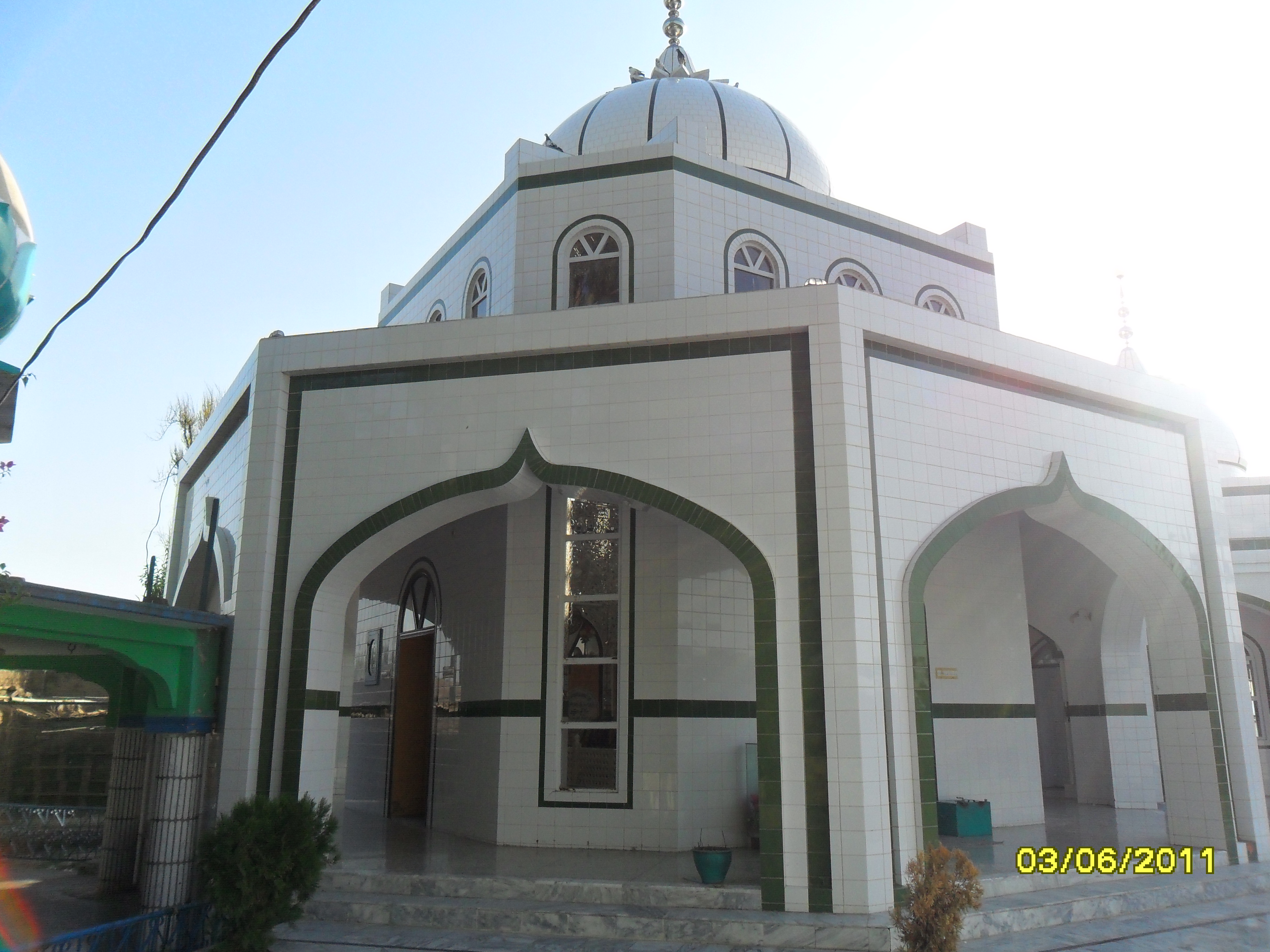
Darbar Sharif Dhunni (Pir Mubarak Ali Shah)

== Education ==
- Hayat Public School Dhunni
- Government High School Dhunni.
- Government Primary School Dhunni.
- Minhaj ul Quran school Dhunni.
- Jinnah Superior school Dhunni.
- Um al Qura school Dhunni

== Mosques ==
- Masjid Usman-e-Gghani, Shumali Mohallah
- Masjid Shumali Mohallah
- Jamia Masjid Hazrat Imam Hussain
- Jamia Masjid Hazrat Ali
- Masjid Al-Noor, Dhunni Adda
- Masjid Syed Pak
- Jamia Masjid of deoband
- Imam Bargah Gulistan-e-Abu Talib
- There are approximately 14 Mosques in this village

== Shrine ==
- Darba e Alia Pir Imam ali shah and Pir Mubarak ali shah Gilani
- Darbar Pir Baba Hanif Shah
- Darbar saeed pak

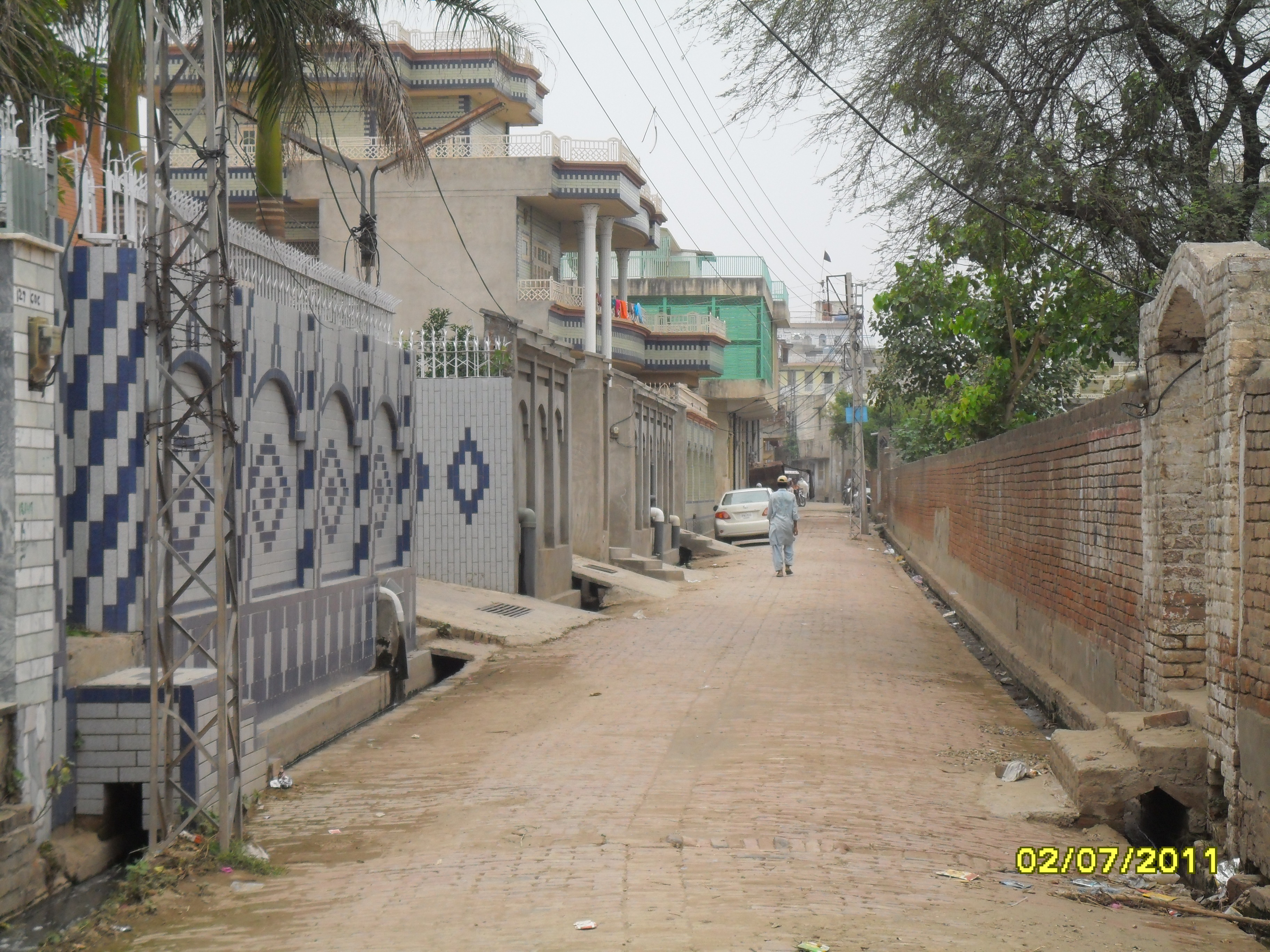
street view Dhunni

- Masajids of Ahel e Sunnat wal jamat
- Khankah Baba Abdul Nabi Sahib

== Bank ==
Habib Bank Limited, Dhunni

== Welfare and religion ==
- Alkhidmat Foundation (Jamaat-e-Islami)
- overseas welfare society Dhunni.
- Sunni Islam
- Mughlia Welfare Society
- Anjuman Ghulaman-e-Qamar Bani Hashemi

== Sports ==
- Dhunni cricket team
- Dhunni pigeon flying club
- Gujjar kabbadi club Dhunni -Ch Amjad Ali Naja Meelu
