= Chachian, Pakistan =

Village in Gujrat district in Punjab

Coordinates: 32.641°N 73.7243°E

Chachian is a village in Gujrat district, in Punjab, Pakistan.

Chachian is about 135 km from Islamabad. Its elevation is 218 m (715 ft).

== History ==
This village claims to have been established in the 16th century.

== Demographics ==
The 2015 population was about 12,000.

== Administration ==
Chachian is part of Kharian Tehsil and is administrated by a Union council, or Jaurah Karnana.

== Education ==
The Government Primary School is one of the oldest primary schools in Chachian. It was initially referred to as Master Fatah Alam Da School. The school was redeveloped in 1980, and continues to serve students today.

Additional schools such as Master Muhammad Shafiq in 2000 and Master Asim Public School Chachian (pet) in 2001 were established to offer gender-segregated educational facilities. The Government High School for Girls in Chachian was established in 1992, and as of 2010, it offers Metric classes for girls.
