= Mandeer =

Mandeer منڈیر
- Location in Pakistan
- Coordinates: 32°46′29″N 73°50′22″E
- Country: Pakistan
- Province: Punjab
- District: Gujrat
- Elevation: 275 m (902 ft)

Population (1998)
  - Total: 10,000
- Time zone: UTC+5 (PST)
- Calling code: 0537015204

Mandeer is a town and union council of Gujrat District, in the Punjab province of Pakistan. It is part of Kharian Tehsil and located at 32°46'0N 73°50'0E with an altitude of 256 metres (843 feet).

The majority of the population belongs to the Jatt tribe. Until the late 1970s agriculture and army jobs were the main occupations for the people of the area. Agriculture is a forgotten profession nowadays. Small land holdings and insufficient irrigation sources have forced people to look for alternatives. From then on till mid-1990s Middle East was the favourite destination for the workers. But now people from Mandeer are working and living in Europe, mainly Denmark, Norway, France and UK. This make Mandeer one of the richest village of Pakistan. Many are well settled and living with their families in Europe and U.S.A.
