= Oqleh Miah =

Oqleh Miah عگله مياح
- Village
- Location within Iran
- Coordinates: 30°46′00″N 49°05′30″E
- Country: Iran
- Province: Khuzestan
- County: Mahshahr
- Bakhsh: Central
- Rural District: Jarahi

Population (2006)
  - Total: 160
- Time zone: UTC+3:30 (IRST)
  - Summer (DST): UTC+4:30 (IRDT)

Oqleh Miah (Persian: عگله مياح, also Romanized as Oqleh Mīāḥ; also known as ‘Aqleh, ‘Oqleh, and Ūgleh Mīāḩ) is a village in Jarahi Rural District, in the Central District of Mahshahr County, Khuzestan Province, Iran. At the 2006 census, its population was 160, in 31 families.
