= Baddo =

Village in Punjab, Pakistan

Baddo Bado
- Location within Pakistan
- Coordinates: 32.46°N 73.43°E
- Country: Pakistan
- Province: Punjab
- Elevation: 262 m (860 ft)
- Time zone: UTC+5 (PST)

Baddo, also spelt Bado, is a village in Gujrat District of the Punjab province of Pakistan.
