= Dera Alampur Gondlan =

Dera Alampur Gondlan (Urdu: ڈیرہ عالم پور گوندلاں) is a village in Tehsil Kharian, in Gujrat District of Punjab, Pakistan. It is located at 32°47'N 73°49.4'E at an altitude of 900 feet. The village is linked to nearby cities by Mohri Road and by Dinga Road.

It has a population of 5,000 people.
