= Chechian =

Chechian Apna Chechian
- Town and union council
- Location in Pakistan
- Coordinates: 32°40′12″N 74°7′15″E
- Country: Pakistan
- Province: Punjab
- District: Gujrat

Government
- Elevation: 239 m (784 ft)
- Time zone: UTC+5 (PST)
- Postal code: 50701

Chechian is a town and union council of Gujrat District, in the Punjab province of Pakistan. It is located at 32°40′20″N 74°7′30″E at an altitude of 239 metres (787 feet).
