= Panjan Kissana =

Coordinates: 32°45′46″N 73°54′24″E

Panjan Kissana پنجن کسانہ
- Interactive map of Panjan Kissana
- Country: Pakistan
- Province: Punjab
- District: Gujrat
- Tehsil: Kharian
- Time zone: UTC+5 (PST)

Panjan Kissana (sometimes spelt Panjan kasana)(پنجن کسانہ) is a town and union council of Gujrat District, in the Punjab province of Pakistan. It is part of Kharian Tehsil and is located at 32°46'0N 73°55'0E at an altitude of 262 metres (862 feet).
