= Bhota, Gujrat =

Village in Punjab, Pakistan

Coordinates: 32.765°N 74.012°E

Bhota is a village in Gujrat District of the Punjab Province, Pakistan. This village came into being in the beginning of the 18th century. The majority of population is from the Muslim Rajput Janjua and Rajput Bhatti caste.

The village post code is 50960.
