= Haji Chak =

Village in Punjab, Pakistan

Coordinates: 32°41′N 73°49′E

Haji Chak is a village in Gujrat District in the Punjab Province, Pakistan. Haji Chak's population is about 4,000. It is a village of the union council Noonawali post office Jaurah Karnana and uses postal code 50251.
