= Lalamusa =

City in Punjab, Pakistan

Lala Musa لالہ موسیٰ
- City
- Location within Punjab, Pakistan Location within Pakistan
- Coordinates: 32°42′1″N 73°57′28″E
- Country: Pakistan
- Province: Punjab
- Division: Gujrat
- District: Gujrat

Government
  - Type: Municipal Committee
  - Chairman: Nadeem Asghar Kaira
- Elevation: 261 m (856 ft)

Population (2023 census)
  - City: 121,036
  - Rank: 100th in Pakistan
- Highways: N-5

Lala Musa (/lɑːləmuːsʌ/; Punjabi: لالہ موسٰے; Urdu: لالہ موسیٰ) is a city, located in the Kharian tehsil of Gujrat district, in Punjab, Pakistan. With a population of 121,036 in 2023, it is the 100th most populous in Pakistan and the 66th most populous city in Punjab and

== History ==
=== Toponymy ===
According to local legend, the city was inhabited by members of the Arain tribe, and the city was named after two brothers from the same tribe, named Lālah (لالہ) and Mūsá (موسٰی) who settled in the old city.

== Geography ==
Lalamusa is situated on the Grand Trunk Road (National Highway 5). It is geographically located at latitude (32.7 degrees) 32° 42' 0" North of the Equator and longitude (73.96 degrees) 73° 57' 35" East of the Prime Meridian on the Map of the world and lies at an altitude of about 250 meters.

It also has major neighbouring cities such as Kharian (16 km) and Gujrat (22 km).

== Demographics ==
=== Population ===
Historical population
Year	Pop.	±% p.a.
1951	17,954	—
1961	22,633	+2.34%
1972	35,430	+4.16%
1981	46,626	+3.10%
1998	59,996	+1.49%
2017	91,566	+2.25%
2023	121,036	+4.76%

According to 2023 census, Lalamusa had a population of 121,036.

Languages

Languages of Lala Musa MC (2023 Census)
1. Punjabi (85.8%)
2. Urdu (9.10%)
3. Pashto (4.70%)
4. Others (0.40%)

== Transport ==
This city is connected through the Grand Trunk Road (National Highway 5) which allows it to be linked to major cities like Islamabad (96.313 miles/155 km to the west) and Lahore (92 miles/148 km to the east).

A railway station (Lala Musa Junction Station) also serves the city for longer journeys operated by Pakistan Railways with around 20 trains travelling throughout the country.

== Government institutions ==
The Punjab Local Government Training Academy is situated in Lalamusa.

== Cultural and leisure sites ==
=== Public parks ===
Lala Musa has a number of public parks and nature reserves like Fatima Jinnah park, Haji Asgar park, etc.

== Notable people ==
- Roshan Ara Begum was a vocalist belonging to the Kirana gharana (singing style) of Hindustani classical music. She is also known by her honorific title Malika-e-Mauseeqi (The Queen of Music) and The Queen of Classical Music in both Pakistan and India.
- Javed Chaudhry is a columnist and journalist from Lala Musa, who is known for his infamous column 'Zero Point'.
- Qamar Zaman Kaira is a senior leader of Pakistan People's Party and a former federal information minister and governor of Gilgit-Baltistan.
- Alam Lohar, a Punjabi folk singer, belonged to Lalamusa. He died in a road accident on 3 July 1979 and was buried in a city graveyard.
- Arif Lohar is a famous folk singer who is also from Lalamusa.
- Suri Sehgal, an Indian-American scientist and philanthropist, grew up in Lala Musa city before the partition of Punjab between India and Pakistan.

== See also ==
- Punjab, Pakistan
- Gujrat Division
- Gujrat District
