= Kotla Arab Ali Khan =

Kotla Arab Ali Khan کوٹلہ ارب علی خان
- Town
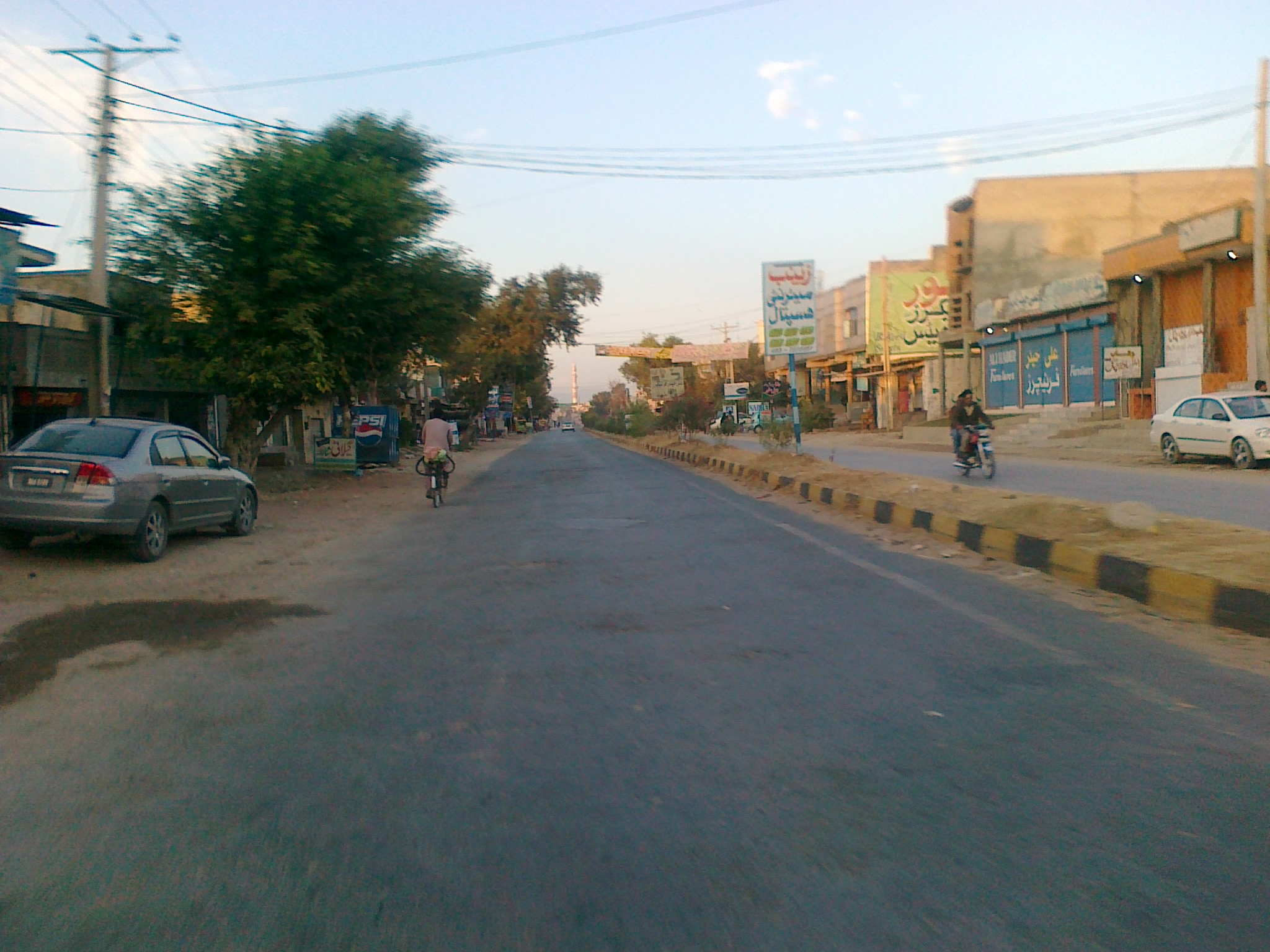
- Nickname: Kotla کوٹلہ
- Location in Pakistan
- Coordinates: 32°51′05″N 74°04′20″E
- Country: Pakistan
- Province: Punjab
- Division: Gujrat
- District: Gujrat
- Tehsil: Kharian

Area
  - Total: 2 km^{2} (0.77 sq mi)
- Time zone: UTC+5 (PST)
- Postal Code: 50990
- Area code: 053

Kotla Arab Ali Khan (Punjabi and Urdu: کوٹلہ ارب علی خان; [koːʈlɑː ərəb əliː xɑːn]; Punjabi: [koːʈlaː əɾəb əliː kʰaːn]; lit. 'Fort of Arab Ali Khan') is a town and union council in the Gujrat District of Punjab, Pakistan. Kotla Arab Ali Khan is Union Council -99 of Kharian Tehsil located in the Gujrat District. The town is located 9 miles from Punjab's border with Azad Kashmir.
