= Dinga =

Town in Punjab, Pakistan

Dinga ڈنگہ
- City
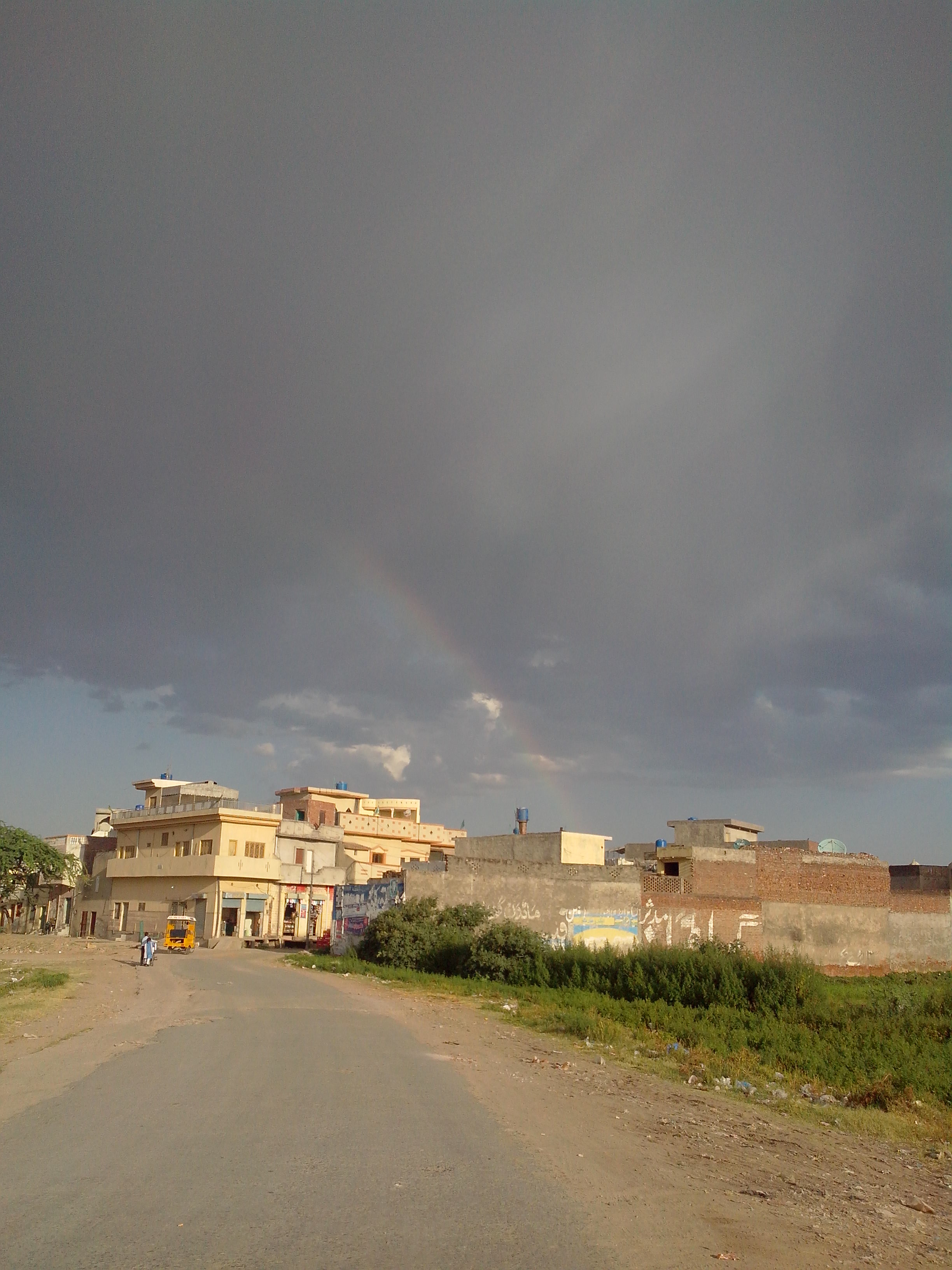
- Dinga in 2016

- Location within Punjab, Pakistan Location within Pakistan
- Coordinates: 32.641°N 73.7243°E
- Country: Pakistan
- Province: Punjab
- Division: Gujrat
- District: Gujrat
- Tehsil: Kharian

Government
  - Type: Municipal Committee
- Elevation: 218 m (715 ft)

Population (2023)
  - City: 94,252
  - Rank: 137th in Pakistan
- Time zone: UTC+5 (PST)
- Postal code: 50280
- Calling code: 053
- Number of union councils: 3
- Number of union councils: 4

Dinga is a city in the Gujrat District, in the province of Punjab, Pakistan. It original name was Deen Gah (دین گاہ); when British came there, they pronounced it as Dinga (ڈینگہ). It lies between the rivers Jhelum and Chenab. The main highway that runs from Lahore to Rawalpindi is about 23 km (16.7 mi) northeast of Dinga. Dinga is about 100 km (62 mi) from the border between Pakistan and India. The population of Dinga was 78,422 per the 2017 census.

Major Muhammad Akram (Nishan-e-Haider winner) was born there.

== Demographics ==
Population

Historical population
Year	Pop.	±% p.a.
1972	13,817	—
1981	20,376	+4.41%
1998	34,180	+3.09%
2017	50,793	+2.11%
2023	94,252	+10.85%

According to the 2023 census, Dinga city has a population of 94,252.
