= Kharian =

City in Punjab, Pakistan

Kharian کھاریاں
- City
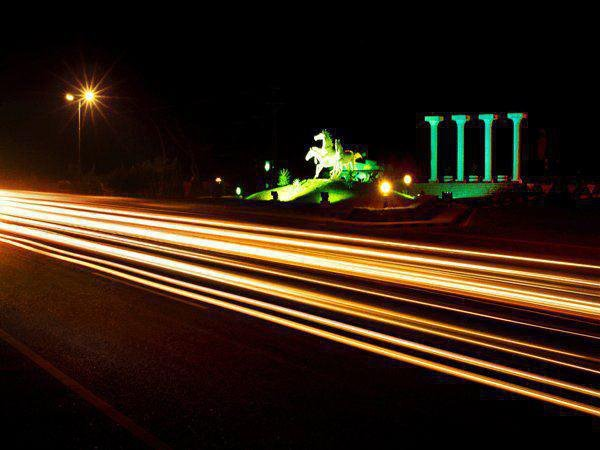
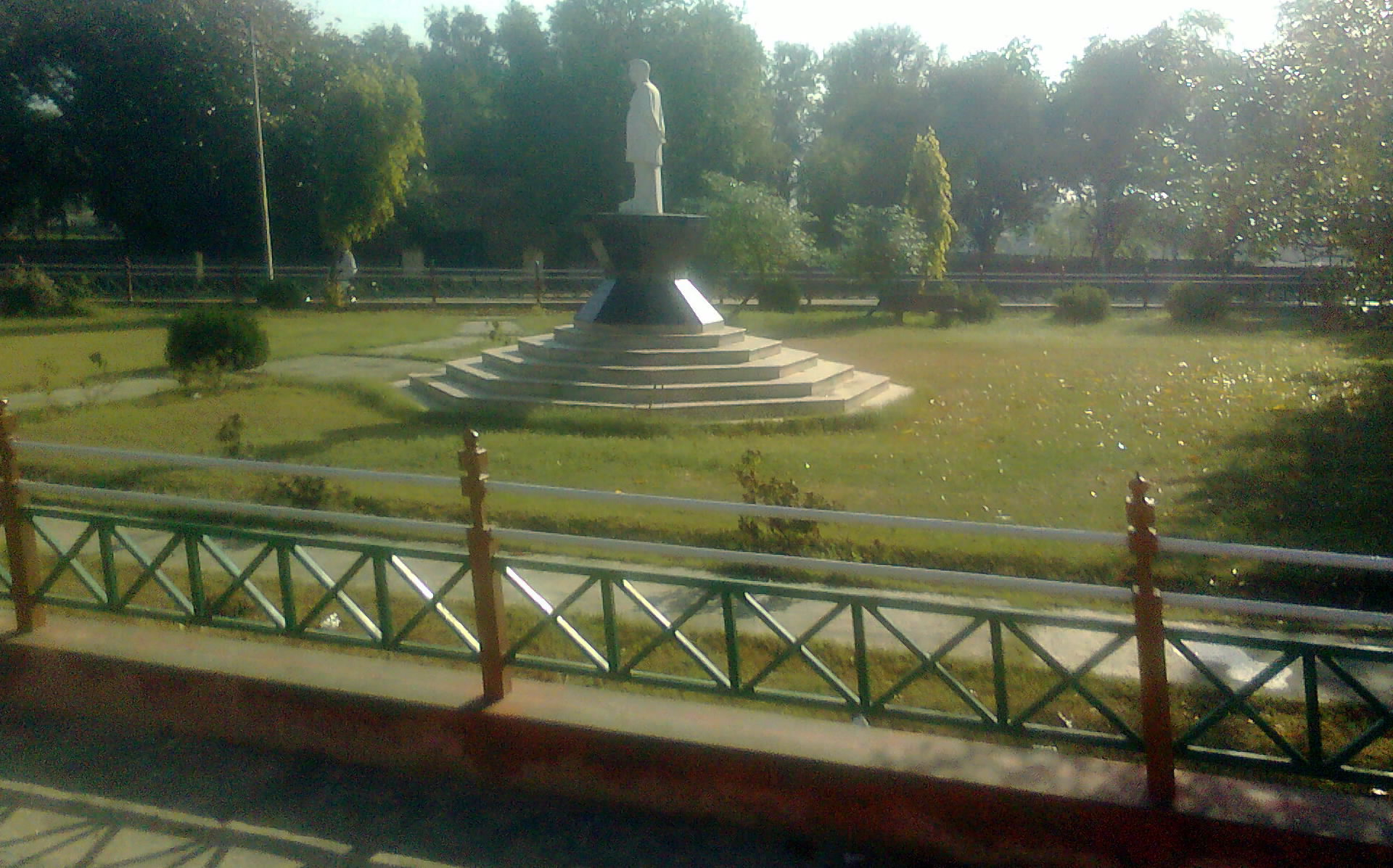
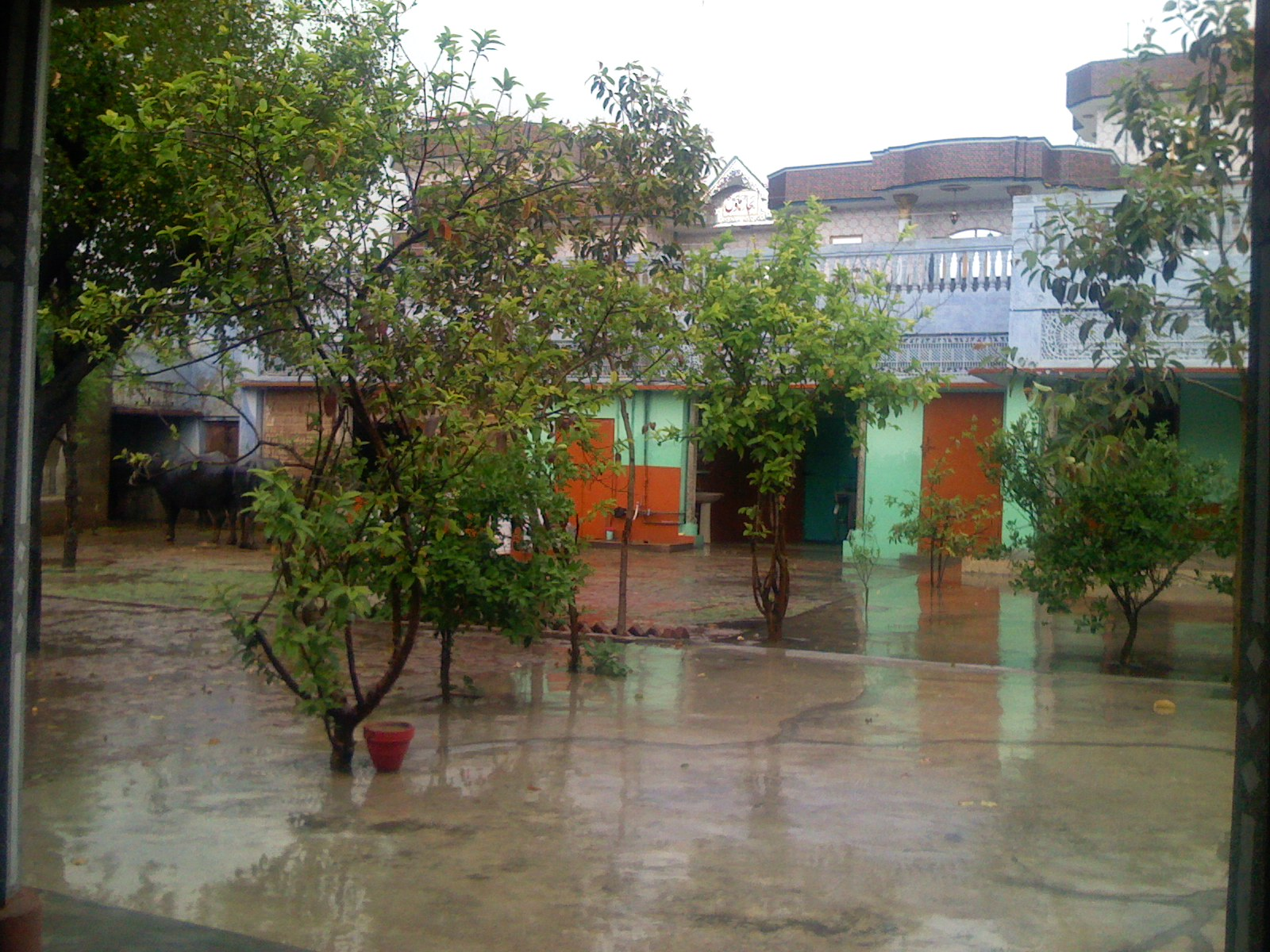
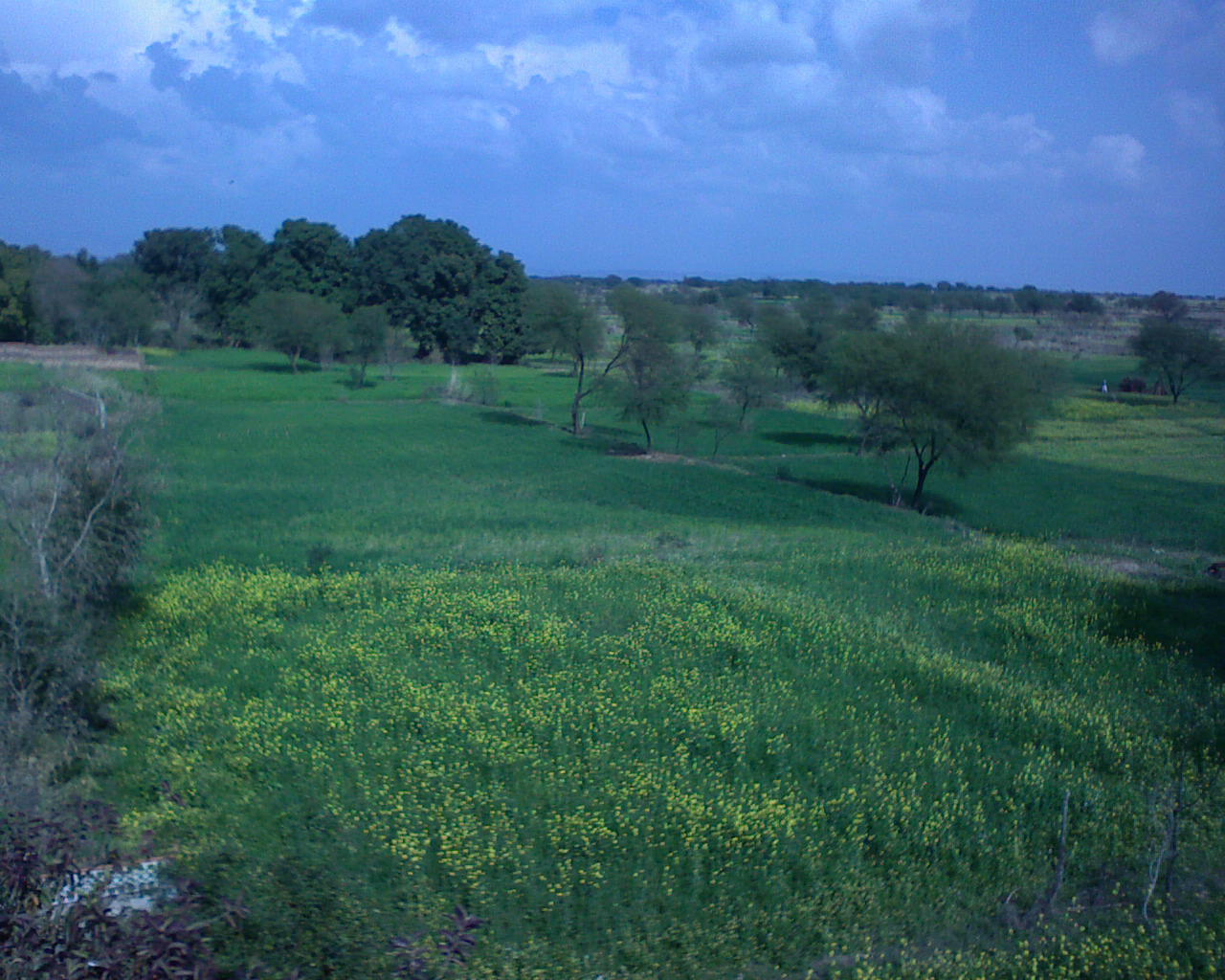
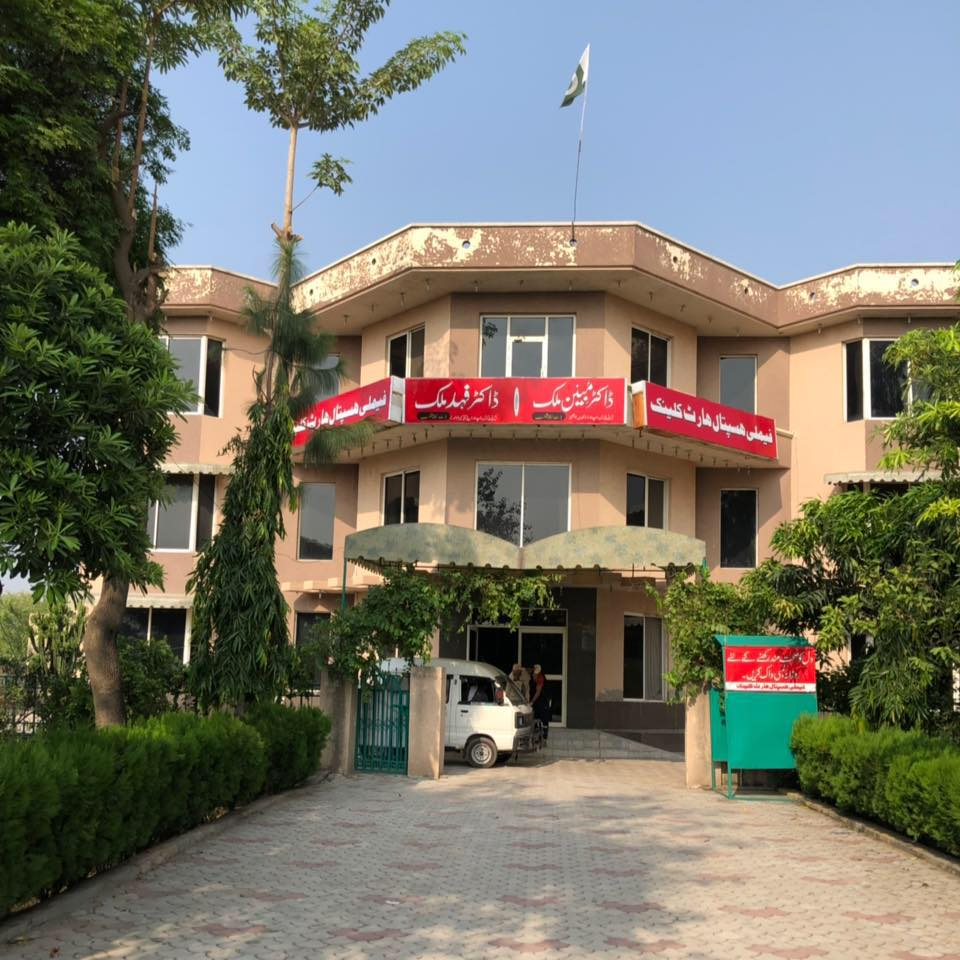
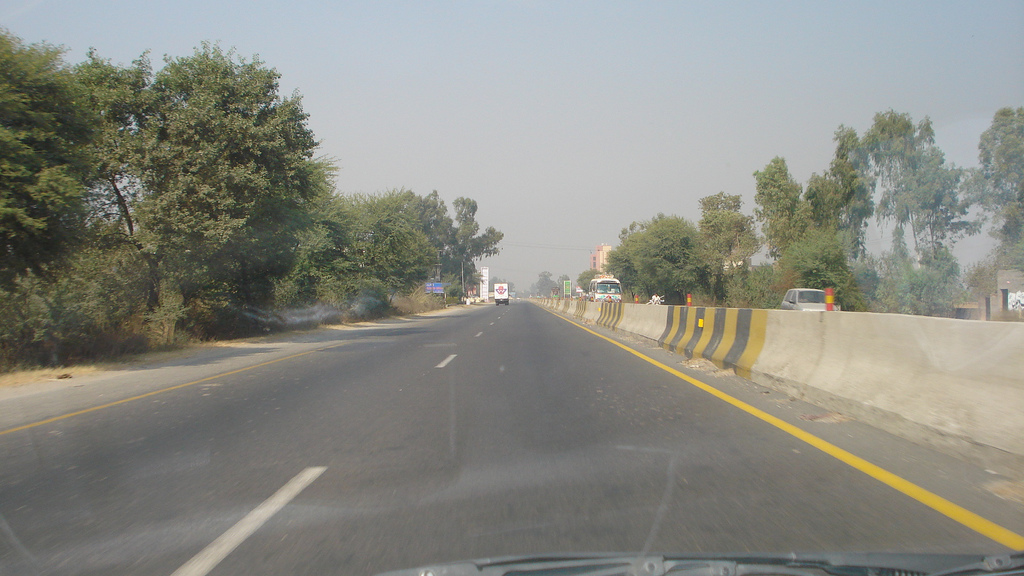
- Cantonment Entrance Statue Park City outskirts Field on the outskirts Family Hospital Heart Clinic Grand Trunk Road
- Nickname: Little Norway/Scandinavia
- Location within Punjab, Pakistan Location within Pakistan
- Coordinates: 32°48′39″N 73°51′53″E
- Country: Pakistan
- Province: (Punjab, Pakistan) Punjab
- Division: Gujrat
- District: Gujrat

Government
  - Type: Municipal Committee
  - Chief Officer: Vacant
  - Municipal Officer: Vacant
- Elevation: 263 m (863 ft)

Population (2023)
  - City: 103,036
  - Rank: 122nd in Pakistan
- Demonym: Kharians
- Time zone: UTC+5 (PST)
- Postal code: 50090
- Calling code: 0537
- Highways: N-5; M-12

Kharian (Note: کھاریاں; Punjabi: [kʰäːˈɾiːjä̃ː]; Urdu: [kʰɑːˈɾijɑ̃ː])) is a city in the north-central part of Punjab, Pakistan. (Note: Regarded as northern with respect to the entire province, but regarded as central too because of its central position in the north.) It is regarded as the 'wealthiest' subdistrict in Pakistan, housing one of the largest cantonments in South Asia, and also being known for its significant overseas population. With a residential population of over 103,036 (as of 2023), Kharian is located at the foothills of the Sub-Himalayan Range and serves as the headquarters of its eponymous subdistrict within the Gujrat district. It is often called the Little Scandinavia of Pakistan because a majority of Pakistani Norwegians and Danish Pakistanis are originally from Kharian. (Note: citations:)

Kharian is known for its agriculture and large expatriate population. Many residents have migrated to Gulf countries and Europe in search of better financial opportunities, and the remittances they send back make up a significant portion of the tehsil's income. This influx of funds is one of the main reasons Kharian is often regarded as the wealthiest tehsil of Pakistan. Additionally, people from other regions of Pakistan move to Kharian seeking employment, filling the labour gap left by those who have moved abroad.

== Demographics ==
=== Population ===
Historical population
Year	Pop.	±%
1951	4,598	—
1961	19,469	+323.4%
1972	21,306	+9.4%
1981	51,506	+141.7%
1998	73,627	+42.9%
2017	87,569	+18.9%
2023	103,036	+17.7%

Languages

Languages of Kharian Tehsil (2023 Census)
1. Punjabi (93.9%)
2. Urdu (2.54%)
3. Pashto (2.49%)
4. Others (1.09%)

== Military ==
Kharian Cantt, the largest military cantonment in Pakistan, is situated within the city and is also home to a substantial civilian population who benefit from services comparable to those in major cities like Islamabad and Lahore, including modern schools, colleges, parks, restaurants, and a well-maintained, regulated environment with regular cleaning. Many residents from nearby areas commute daily to Kharian Cantt for its amenities.

== Notable people ==
- Ismat Beg, scientist.
- Major Raja Aziz Bhatti (1928 - 10 September 1965), recipient of Pakistan's highest award for valor Nishan-e-Haider (Lit.: Emblem of Lion)
- Fazal Elahi Chaudhry, the fifth President of Pakistan.
- Etzaz Hussain, footballer
- Abdullah Iqbal, footballer
- Alam Lohar, (1928 - 3 July 1979), Prominent Punjabi folk music singer.

== See also ==
- Kharian Cantonment
