= Gujrat Division =

Gujrat Division گجرات ڈویژن
- Division
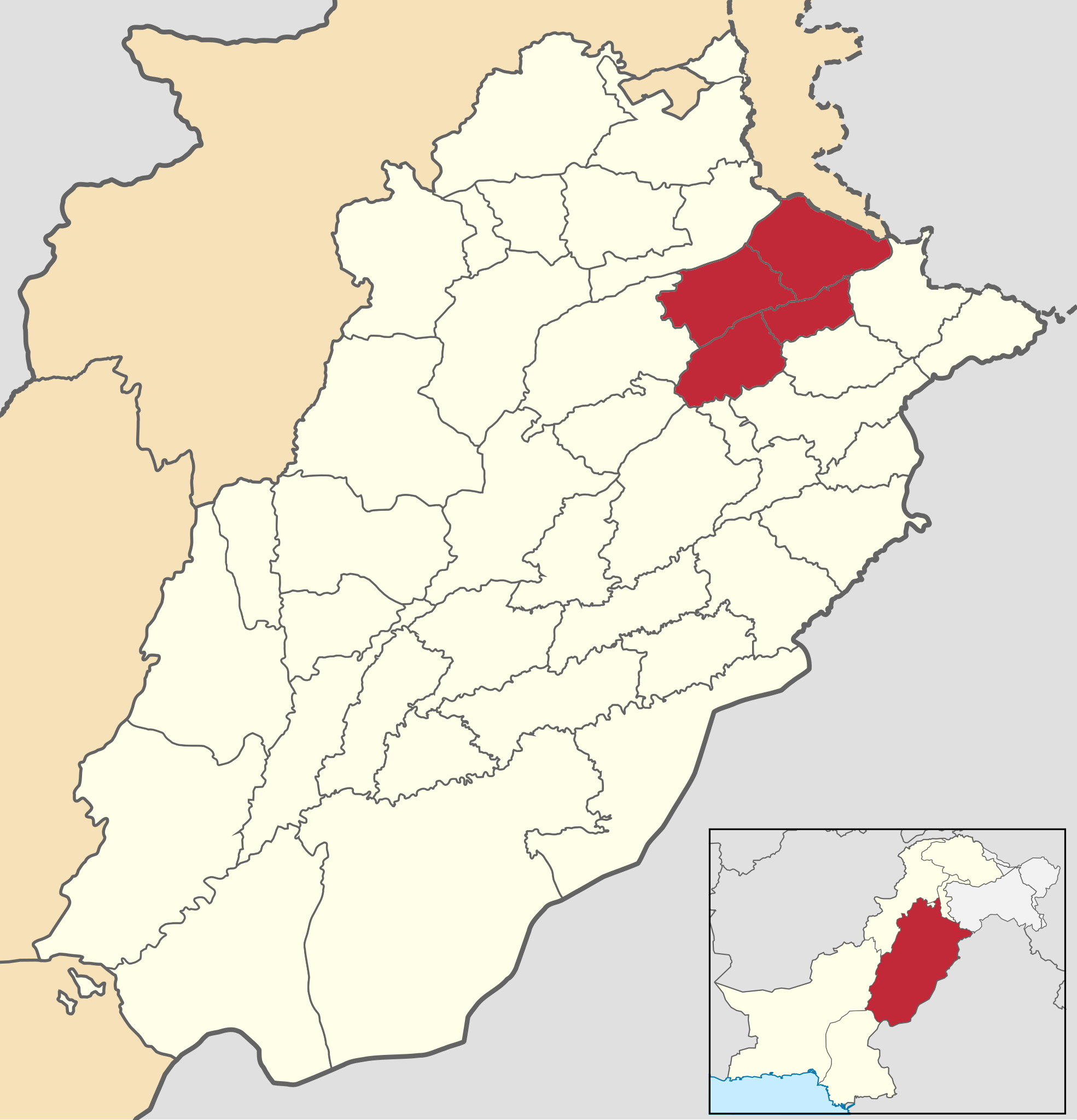
- Map of Gujrat Division
- Country: Pakistan
- Province: Punjab
- Capital: Gujrat
- Established: 17 August 2022
- Districts: 04: Gujrat District Hafizabad District Mandi Bahauddin District Wazirabad District

Government
  - Type: Divisional Administration
  - Commissioner: Syed Naveed Hyder sherazi
  - Mayor: Vacant
  - Regional police officer: D.I.G. Muntazir Mehdi

Area
  - Division: 9,438 km^{2} (3,644 sq mi)

Population (2023)
  - Division: 7,362,182
  - Density: 780.1/km^{2} (2,020/sq mi)
  - Urban: 2,543,794 (34.50%)
  - Rural: 4,818,388 (65.50%)

Literacy (2023)
  - Literacy rate: Total: (75.30%); Male: (79.16%); Female: (73.61%)
- Time zone: UTC+5 (PST)

Gujrat Division (Note: Punjabi and Urdu: گجرات ڈویژن) (Punjabi: [ɡʊd͡ʒə̆ˈɾaːt̪ə̆ ɖɪˈʋiːʒən]), also called Division X, is an administrative division of Punjab, Pakistan, comprising the districts of Gujrat, Hafizabad, Mandi Bahauddin, and Wazirabad; and headquartered at the city of Gujrat in northern Punjab. With a population of over 7.3 million, it is the least populous of the ten divisions in the province.

== History ==
It was officially established as the tenth division of the province by the Punjab government on 17 August 2022, with the bifurcation of Gujranwala Division. Initially including the districts of Gujrat, Mandi Bahauddin, and Hafizabad, the newly-established Wazirabad District was added on 14 October 2022, increasing the number of districts in the division to four. The change was made official after a notification issued by the Board of Revenue under section 5 of the Punjab Land Revenue Act 1967. Before this bifurcation, Gujranwala division was among the largest in the province, with a population of approximately 16 million. Ahmad Kamal Maan was notified as the first commissioner of the division and Mohammad Akhtar Abbas will be the Regional police officer (RPO).

Meanwhile, on 15 February 2023 the Punjab caretaker government suspended the notifications of the newly established division of Gujrat, newly created district Wazirabad and three new tehsils in the division. According to the new notification issued by the Board of Revenue, the notifications of creation of Gujrat Division, Wazirabad District, three new tehsils Jalalpur Jattan and Kunjah in Gujrat District and Alipur Chattha Tehsil in Wazirabad District (newly created) were suspended. According to the new notification, the suspension was valid till the general election in Punjab.

However, on 21 February 2023, Lahore High Court suspended caretaker government's order and revived Gujrat as division.

Despite the legal restoration, Gujrat Division remained largely non-functional for over a year due to the removal of key administrative officers, lack of budget allocation, and interim arrangements that placed Gujrat under the acting charge of officials from Gujranwala Division.

On 18 December 2024, the Division was officially notified by the Punjab Board of Revenue, following approval from the Governor of Punjab and in compliance with an earlier Lahore High Court ruling, reaffirming the division's legal and administrative status, marked a turning point. It confirmed the inclusion of all four districts, ended ambiguity, and set the groundwork for regular staffing, independent budget allocation, and the operationalization of divisional institutions.

== Geography ==
Gujrat Division is located at about 32.5 degrees north latitude and 74.0 degrees longitude in north Pakistan in the Punjab region. It lies on the Pakistan national highway N-5 about halfway between Islamabad and Lahore. Gujrat division is bordered by five other divisions including Rawalpindi Division, Sargodha Division, Faisalabad Division, Lahore Division and Gujranwala Division.

Gujrat division has two rivers Chenab River and Jhelum River.

== Demographics ==
=== Population ===
Historical population
Year	Pop.	±% p.a.
1951	1,626,496	—
1961	1,872,505	+1.42%
1972	2,713,675	+3.43%
1981	3,264,764	+2.08%
1998	4,685,773	+2.15%
2017	6,337,678	+1.60%
2023	7,362,182	+2.53%
Sources: (Note: Due to Gujrat Division being split from Gujranwala in 2023, it is not listed as a division in the census tables. This total population is based on a summation of the districts. Furthermore, Wazirabad is not listed in the province-wise table, only the division-wise one.)

According to the 2023 census, Gujrat division had a population of 7,362,182 nearly equal to the country of Serbia or the US state of Michigan.

== List of the Districts ==
District	Headquarter	Area (km²)	Pop. (2023)	Density (ppl/km²) (2023)	Lit. rate (2023)
Gujrat	Gujrat	3,192	3,219,375	1,007.0	81.37%
Mandi Bahauddin	Mandi Bahauddin	2,673	1,829,486	683.1	70.27%
Hafizabad	Hafizabad	2,367	1,319,909	557.0	65.77%
Wazirabad	Wazirabad	1,206	993,412	820	77.39%
Total		9,438	7,362,182	780	75.30%

== List of the Tehsils ==
Tehsil	Area (km²)	Pop. (2023)	Density (ppl/km²) (2023)	Lit. rate (2023)	Districts
Gujrat	1,463	1,746,173	1,193.56	82.48%	Gujrat District
Kharian	1,154	1,174,935	1,018.14	79.69%	Gujrat District
Sarai Alamgir	575	298,267	518.73	81.55	Gujrat District
Jalalpur Jattan	...	...	...	...	Gujrat District
Kunjah	...	...	...	...	Gujrat District
Pindi Bhattian	1,178	558,753	474.32	58.70%	Hafizabad District
Hafizabad	1,189	761,156	640.16	70.89%	Hafizabad District
Mandi Bahauddin	759	764,532	1,007.29	72.69%	Mandi Bahauddin District
Malakwal	759	429,303	565.62	66.28%	Mandi Bahauddin District
Phalia	1,155	635,651	550.35	70.11%	Mandi Bahauddin District
Wazirabad	1,196	993,412	830.61	77.39%	Wazirabad District
Ali Pur Chatta	...	...	...	...	Wazirabad District

== List of the constituencies in National Assembly and Provincial Assembly ==
#	Provincial Assembly Constituency	National Assembly Constituency	District
1	PP-27 Gujrat-I	NA-62 Gujrat-I	Gujrat
2	PP-28 Gujrat-II	NA-62 Gujrat-I	Gujrat
3	PP-29 Gujrat-III	NA-63 Gujrat-II	Gujrat
4	PP-30 Gujrat-IV	NA-63 Gujrat-II	Gujrat
5	PP-31 Gujrat-V	NA-64 Gujrat-III	Gujrat
6	PP-32 Gujrat-VI	NA-64 Gujrat-III	Gujrat
7	PP-33 Gujrat-VII	NA-65 Gujrat-IV	Gujrat
8	PP-34 Gujrat-VIII	NA-65 Gujrat-IV	Gujrat
9	PP-35 Wazirabad-I	NA-66 Wazirabad	Wazirabad
10	PP-36 Wazirabad-II	NA-66 Wazirabad	Wazirabad
11	PP-37 Hafizabad-I	NA-67 Hafizabad	Hafizabad
12	PP-38 Hafizabad-II	NA-67 Hafizabad	Hafizabad
13	PP-39 Hafizabad-III	NA-67 Hafizabad	Hafizabad
14	PP-40 Mandi Bahauddin-I	NA-68 Mandi Bahauddin-I	Mandi Bahauddin
15	PP-41 Mandi Bahauddin-II	NA-68 Mandi Bahauddin-I	Mandi Bahauddin
16	PP-42 Mandi Bahauddin-III	NA-69 Mandi Bahauddin-II	Mandi Bahauddin
17	PP-43 Mandi Bahauddin-IV	NA-69 Mandi Bahauddin-II	Mandi Bahauddin

== See also ==
- Divisions of Pakistan
  - Divisions of Balochistan
  - Divisions of Khyber Pakhtunkhwa
  - Divisions of Punjab
  - Divisions of Sindh
  - Divisions of Azad Kashmir
  - Divisions of Gilgit-Baltistan
- Districts of Pakistan
