= Jalalpur–Gujrat Road =

Road in Pakistan

Coordinates: 32°35′48″N 74°07′30.6″E

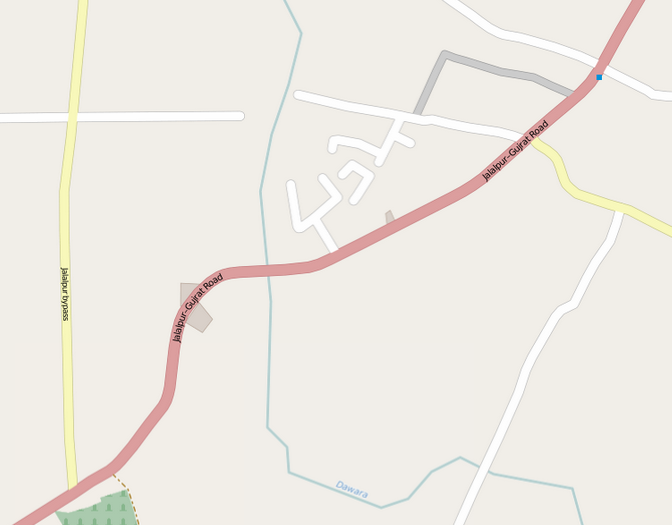

Major junctions
- North end: Jalalpur Jattan
- South end: Gujrat

Location
- Country: Pakistan

Highway system
- Roads in Pakistan

The Jalalpur–Gujrat Road is a highway running between the Pakistani cities of Gujrat and Jalalpur Jattan. It connects Gujrat with Jalalpure Jattan, Tanda, Chamb Azad Kashmir.

Gujrat is disengaged with north by a rivulet on its northern border whereas Jalalpur Jattan is detached with south by another rivulet on its southern border. In between these two cities are villages of Moin Ud Din Pur, Sook Kalan, Sook Khurd, Shah Jahanian, Kala Chak, Hardas Pur, Kot Ameer Hussain, Hafiz Hayat, Hayat Garh, Ikhlas Garh, Maroof, and Kheewa etc. The road connects these villages with the district. The main campus of University of Gujrat and Nawaz Sharif Medical College located in Hafiz Hayat, are connected with Gujrat through this road.

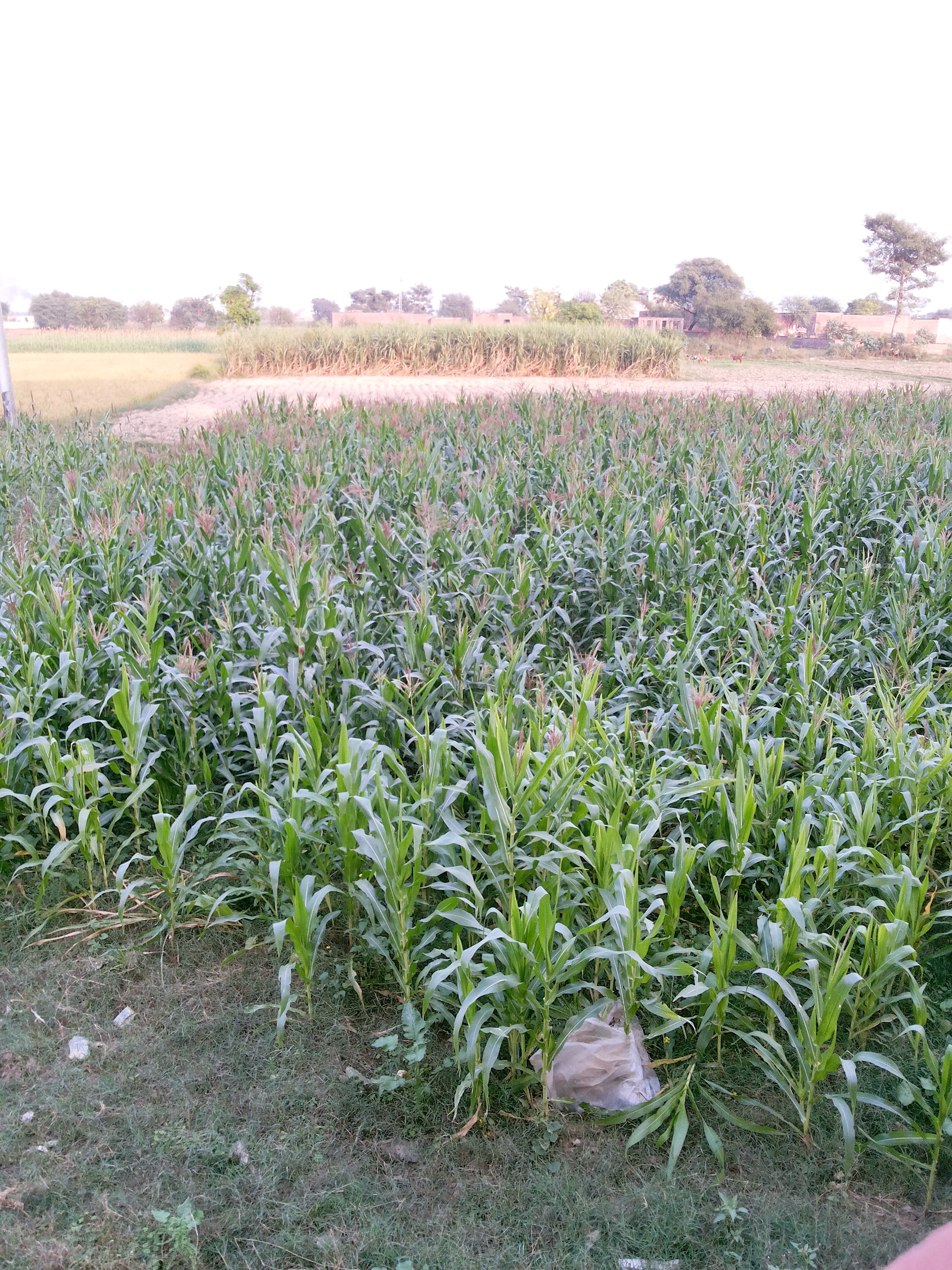
Vegetation near Kheewa alongside Jalalpur–Gujrat Road

== See also ==
- Gujrat
- Jalalpur Jattan
