= Ranewal =

Ranewal رانیوال سیداں
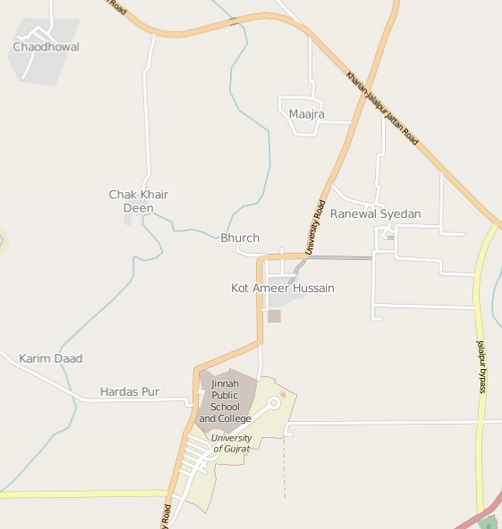
- Location of Ranewal on map

- Location within Pakistan
- Coordinates: 32°39′22.4″N 74°10′31.7″E
- Country: Pakistan
- Province: Punjab
- Elevation: 234 m (768 ft)
- Time zone: UTC+5 (PST)
- Calling code: 053

Ranewal, also known as Ranewal Syedan (Urdu: رانیوال سیداں), is a village west of Jalalpur Jattan and near the University of Gujrat main campus in the Gujrat District of Punjab, Pakistan. The village is named after the family who lived there, believed to be Sayyid. It has an altitude of 234 metres.
