= Bhurch =

Coordinates: 32°39′11.9″N 74°09′50.2″E

Bhurch بھرچ
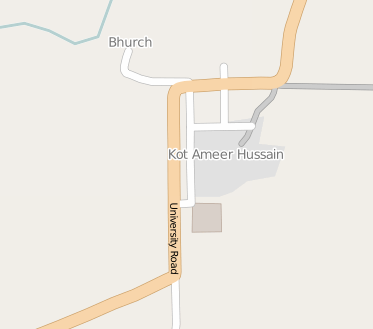
- Bhurch lies southwest of Kot Ameer Hussain

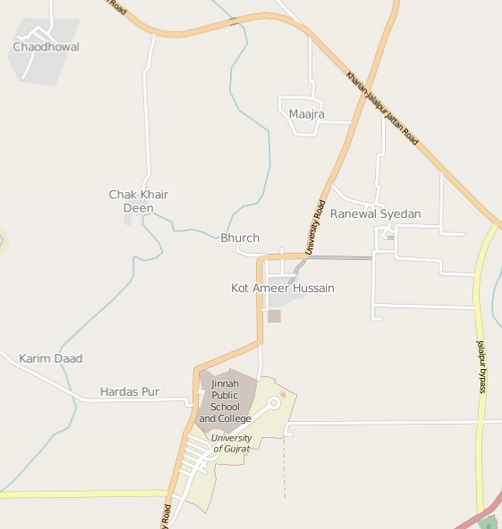
- Location of Bhurch on map
- Country: Pakistan
- Province: Punjab
- District: Gujrat
- Time zone: UTC+5 (PST)
- Calling code: 053

Bhurch (Urdu: بھرچ) is a village near Kot Ameer Hussain in Gujrat District, of the Punjab province in Pakistan.
