= Salamgarh =

Salamgarh سلام گڑھ
- Islamgarh
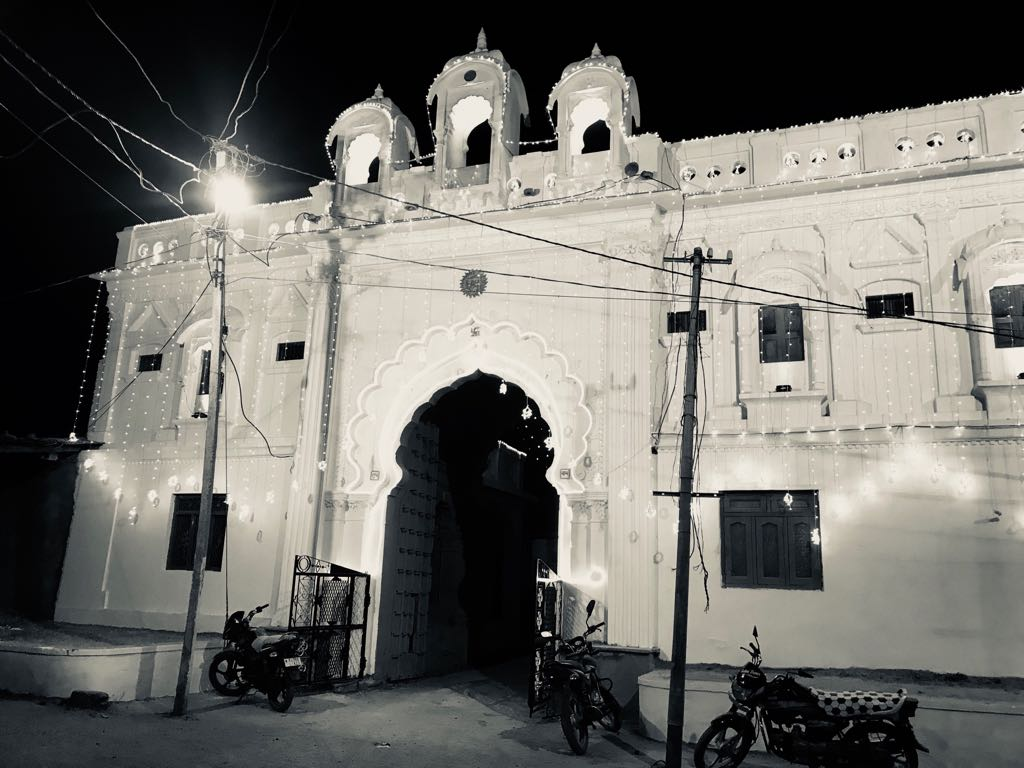
- Gate of Salamgarh at night

- Location of Salamgarh Salamgarh (Pakistan)
- Country: Pakistan
- Province: Punjab
- District: Gujrat
- City: Jalalpur Jattan
- Time zone: UTC+5 (PKT)
- Calling code: 053

Salamgarh (Punjabi: سلام گڑھ), officially Islamgarh (Urdu: اسلام گڑھ), is an old city and now a neighbourhood in Jalalpur Jattan, in Punjab, Pakistan. It is situated to the south of the old city of Jalalpur Jattan.

== History ==
There exist remnants of a fort believed to be built by Chandragupta Maurya in 300 BC. The original name of the village could not be ascertained but the fort became famous as Islamgarh Fort with the passage of time. The fort of Islamgarh had remained under Aurangzeb Alamgir, Ahmed Shah Abdali, and Ranjit Singh and their forces.
