= Shahjahanian =

Coordinates: 32°44′44″N 74°06′25″E

Shahjahanian شاہجہانیاں
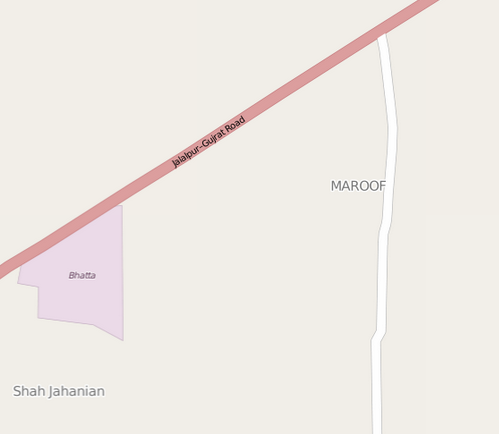
- Location of Shah Jahanian alongside Jalalpur–Gujrat Road
- Country: Pakistan
- Province: Punjab
- District: Gujrat
- Time zone: UTC+5 (PST)
- Calling code: 053

Shahjahanian (Urdu: شاہجہانیاں also spelled Shah Jahanian) is a village in Gujrat District, of Punjab, Pakistan. It is situated about 12 kilometres northeast of Gujrat city.
