= Gurdwara Janam Asthan Guru Ram Das =

Gurdwara Janam Asthan Guru Ram Das ਗੁਰੂਦਵਾਰਾ ਜਨਮ ਅਸਥਾਨ ਗੁਰੂ ਰਾਮਦਾਸ گردوارہ جنم استھان گورو رام داس
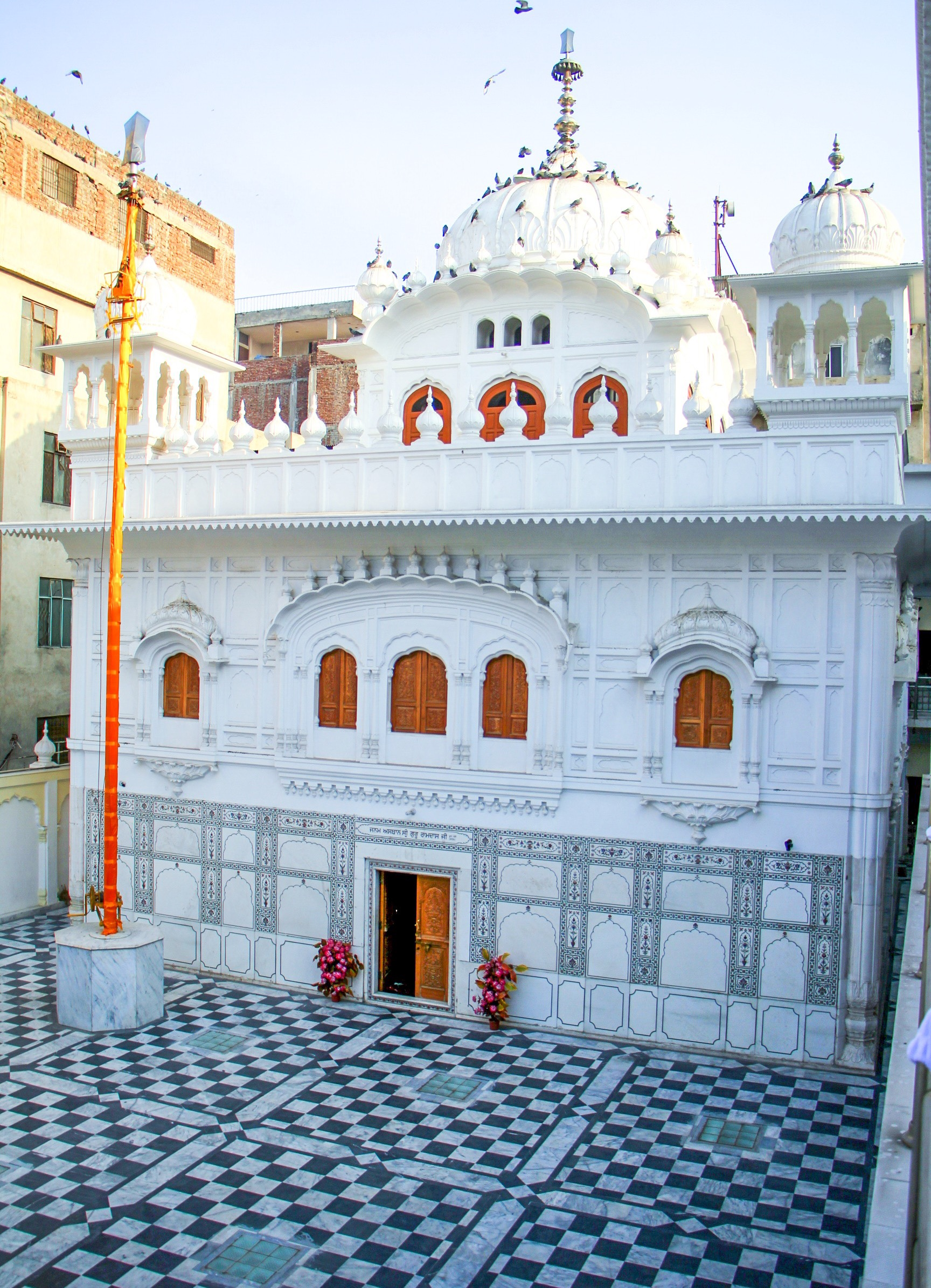
- Interactive map of the Gurdwara Janam Asthan Guru Ram Das ਗੁਰੂਦਵਾਰਾ ਜਨਮ ਅਸਥਾਨ ਗੁਰੂ ਰਾਮਦਾਸ گردوارہ جنم استھان گورو رام داس area

General information
- Architectural style: Sikh Empire style
- Location: Chuna Mandi, Lahore, Punjab, Pakistan
- Coordinates: 31°35′06″N 74°19′16″E
- Construction started: 1801

The Janam Asthan Guru Ram Das (Punjabi, Urdu: گردوارہ جنم استھان گورو رام داس), also known as Gurdwara Janamasthan Patshahi Chauthi, is a gurdwara in Lahore, Pakistan. The gurdwara was built atop the site traditionally believed to be the location of the birthplace and childhood home of Guru Ram Das, the 4th Sikh guru.

== Location ==
The gurdwara is located in the Chuna Mandi Bazaar in the Walled City of Lahore, near the Lahore Fort, and Begum Shahi Mosque. The shrine is located along the Shahi Guzargah, or "Royal Passage" that began at Delhi Gate, and terminated at the Lahore Fort. The gurdwara is located at the coordinates 31°35'05.6"N 74°19'15.9"E.

== History ==
Guru Ram Das was born in the Chuna Mandi Bazaar of Lahore in 1534 CE, to parents Hari Das and Mata Daya.

The childhood home existed until the era of Maharaja Ranjit Singh, who purportedly was asked to build a new shrine at the site during the birth celebrations of Kharak Singh in 1801 by his wife, Maharani Datar Kaur. Ranjit Singh agreed to the request, and acquired plots surrounding the site in order to build a new gurdwara. 18 Sikhs were reportedly killed in the gurdwara premises during communal rioting that occurred during the Partition of British India. Before 1947, the gurdwara had eighteen shops associated with it.

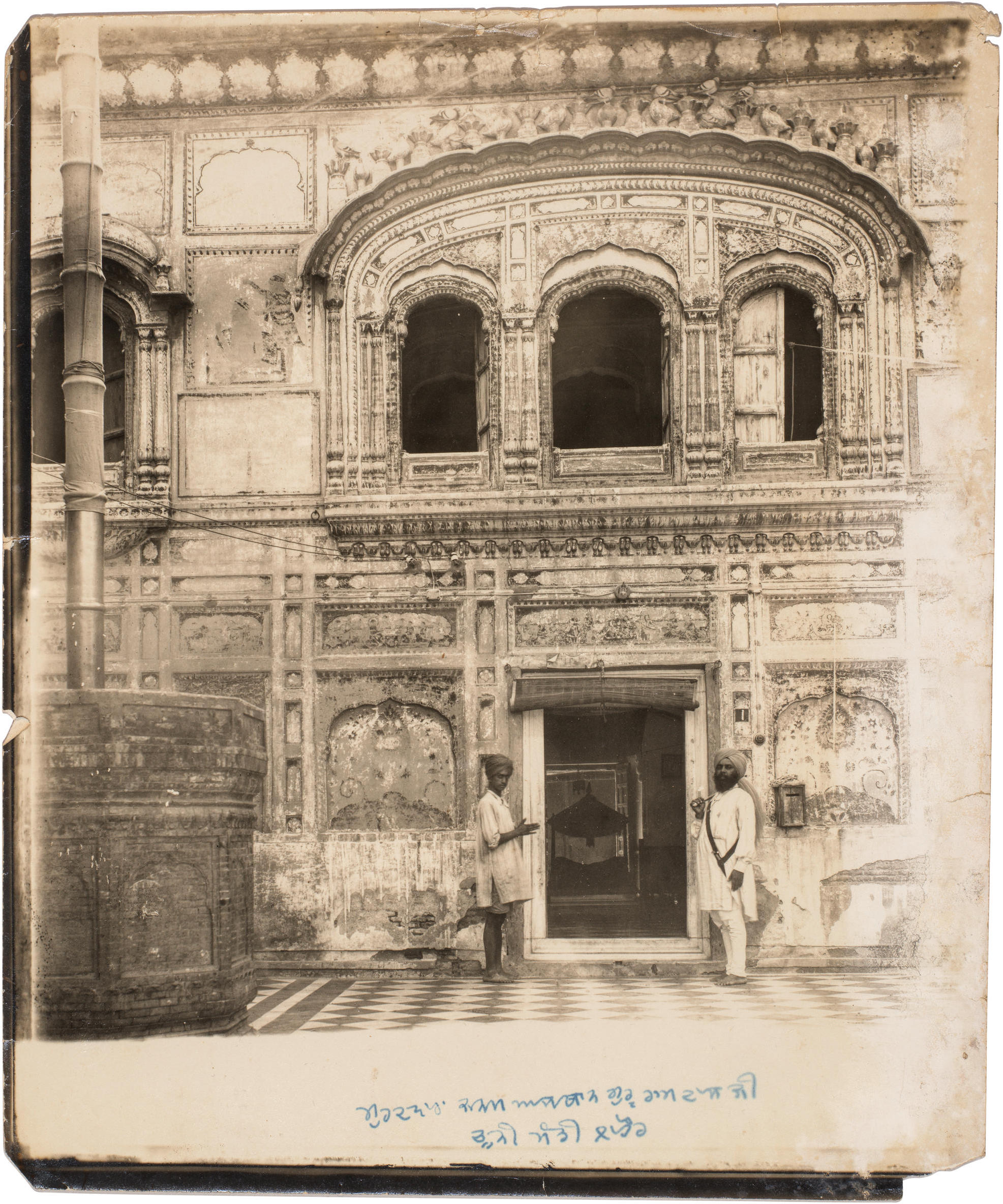
Photograph of Gurdwara Janam Asthan Guru Ram Das taken by Kahn Singh Nabha in the 1920s and published in the Mahan Kosh (1930)

== Architecture ==
The shrine was built atop a white marble platform, which is built several steps above street-level. The shrine measures 122 feet 6 inches by 97 feet 6 inches. To the west of the shrine is an open courtyard, surrounded on two sides by a two-story building. An old well can be found at the site.

== Management ==
The shrine is managed by the Evacuee Trust Department of the Government of Pakistan. Readings from the Guru Granth Sahib are carried out daily at the shrine.

== Gallery ==
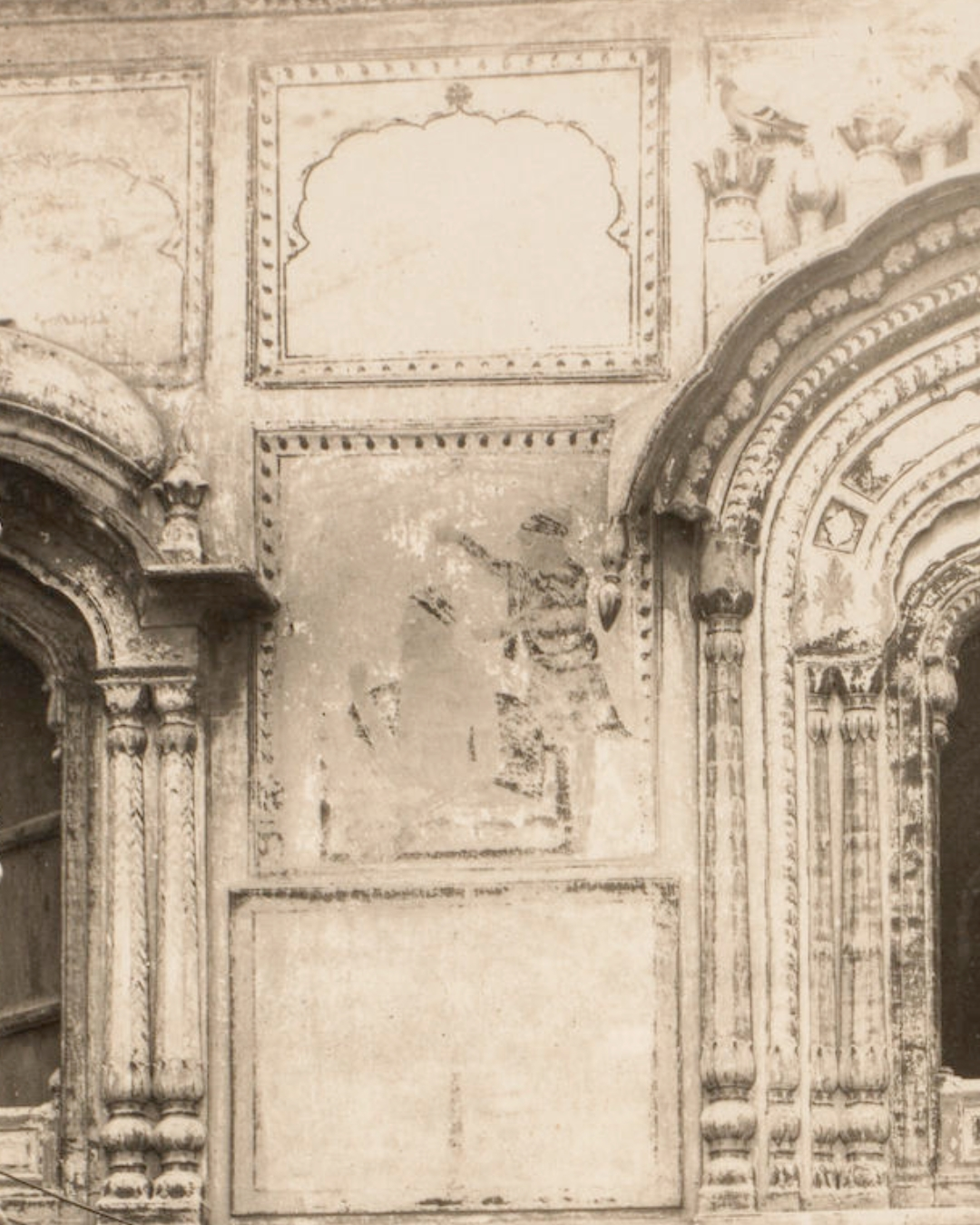
Photograph of a defaced and damaged fresco of Guru Ram Das that once adorned the exterior wall of Gurdwara Janam Asthan Guru Ram Das, located in Chuna Mandi, Lahore, Punjab, circa 1920's

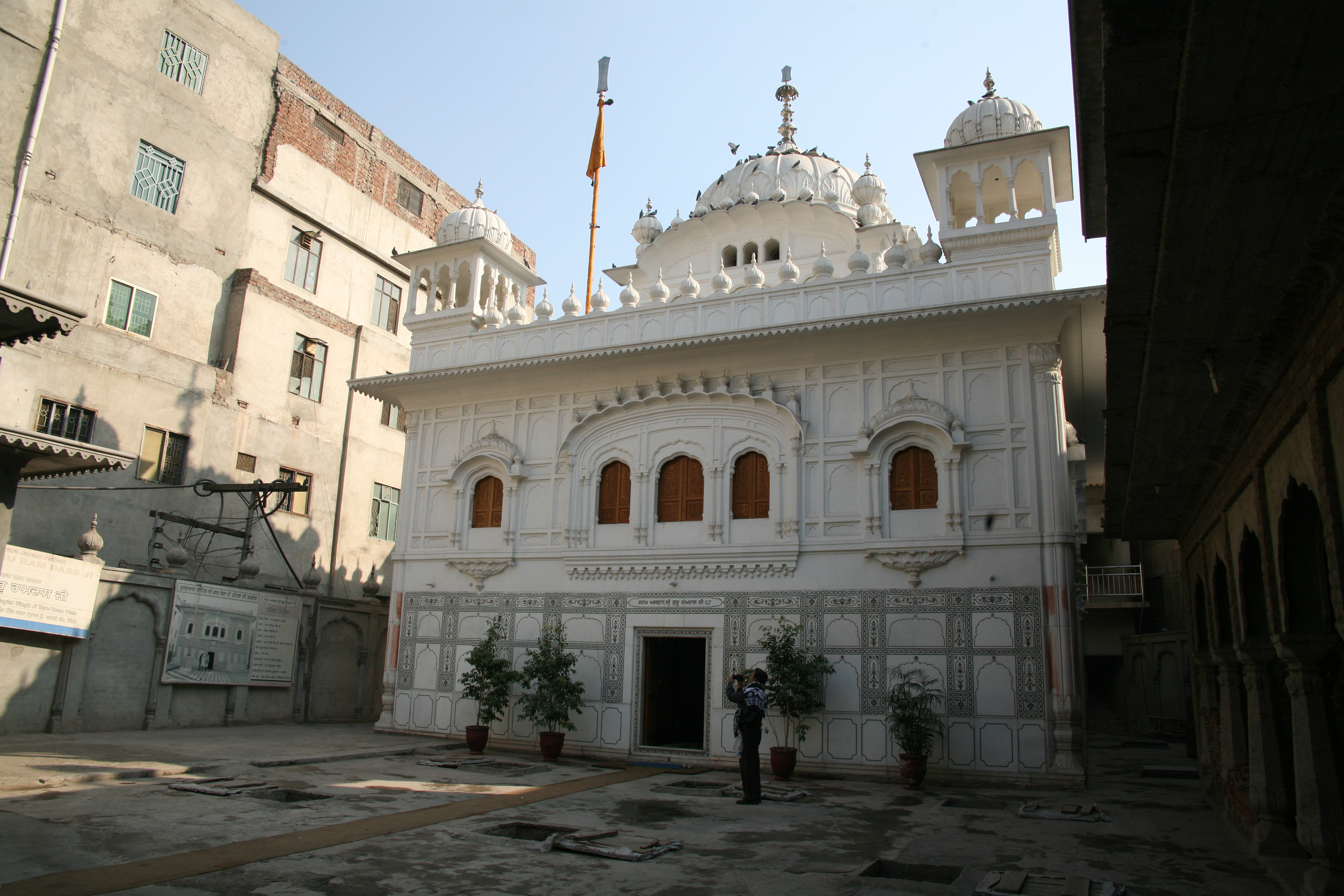

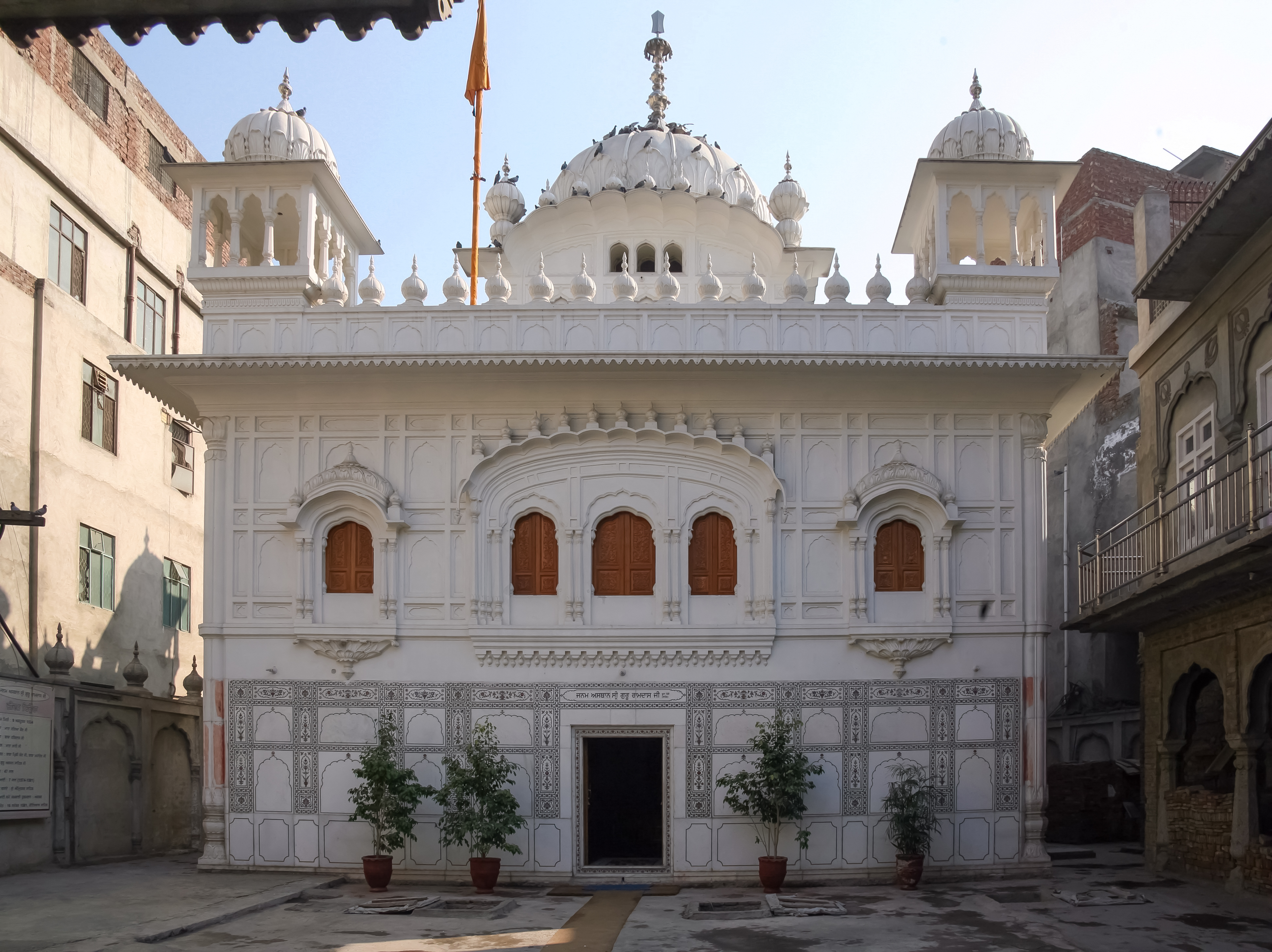

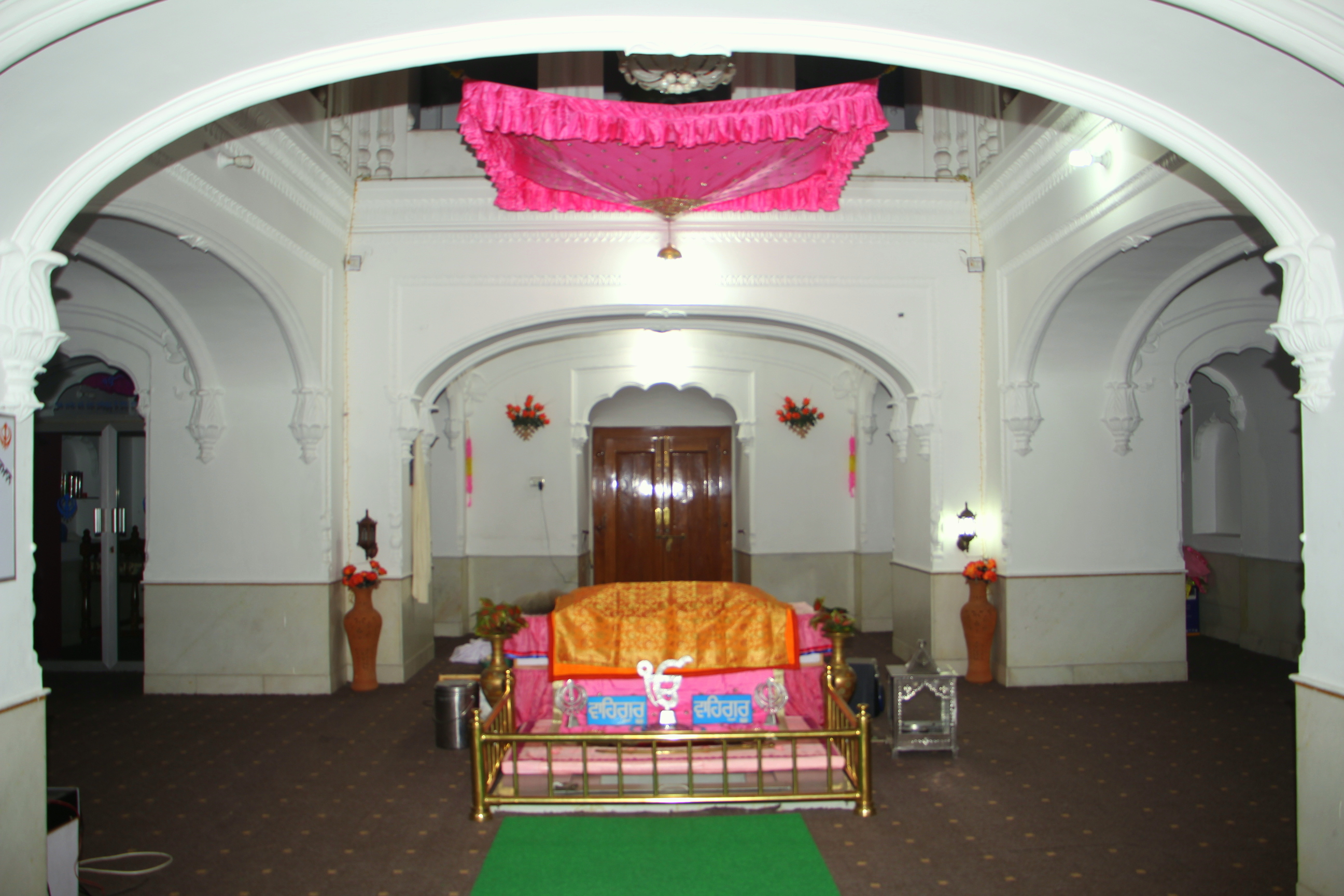
The gurdwara's interior

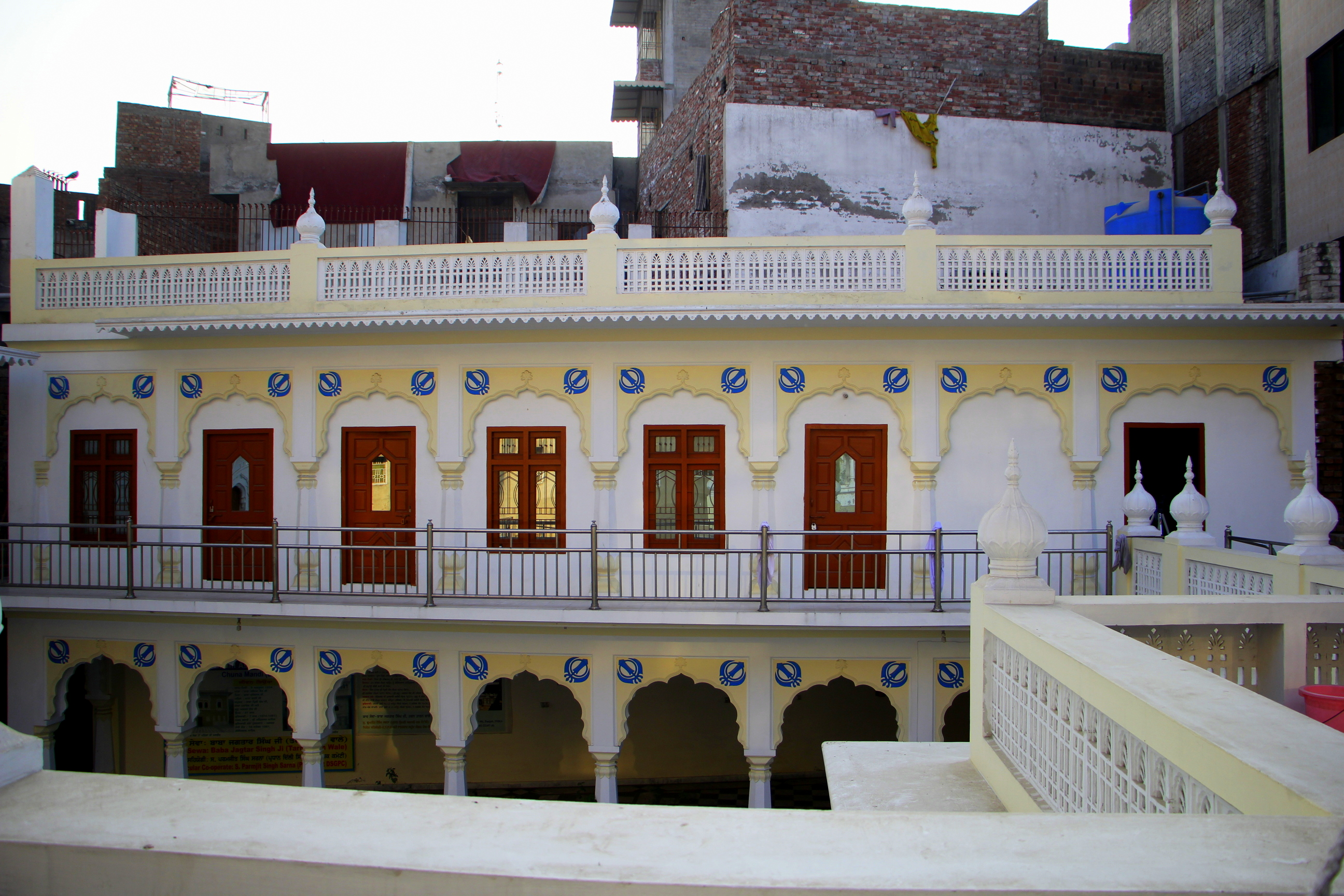
The complex features additional buildings.

== See also ==
- Guru Ram Das
- Sikhism
- Sikhism in Pakistan
