= Hayatgarh =

Coordinates: 32°37′14.4″N 74°11′4.3″E

Hayat Garh حیات گڑھ
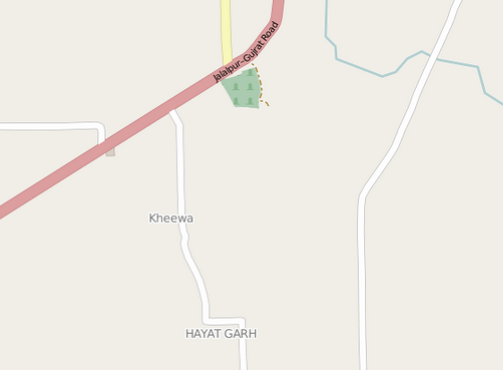
- Location of Hayat Garh in map
- Country: Pakistan
- Province: Punjab
- District: Gujrat
- Time zone: UTC+5 (PST)
- Calling code: 053

Hayatgarh (Urdu: حیات گڑھ, also spelled as Hayat Garh) is a village in Gujrat District, in Punjab, Pakistan. Hyatgarh is located near the village Kheewa.
