= Guru Ram Das =

Fourth Sikh guru from 1574 to 1581

- ਗੁਰੂ ਰਾਮ ਦਾਸ
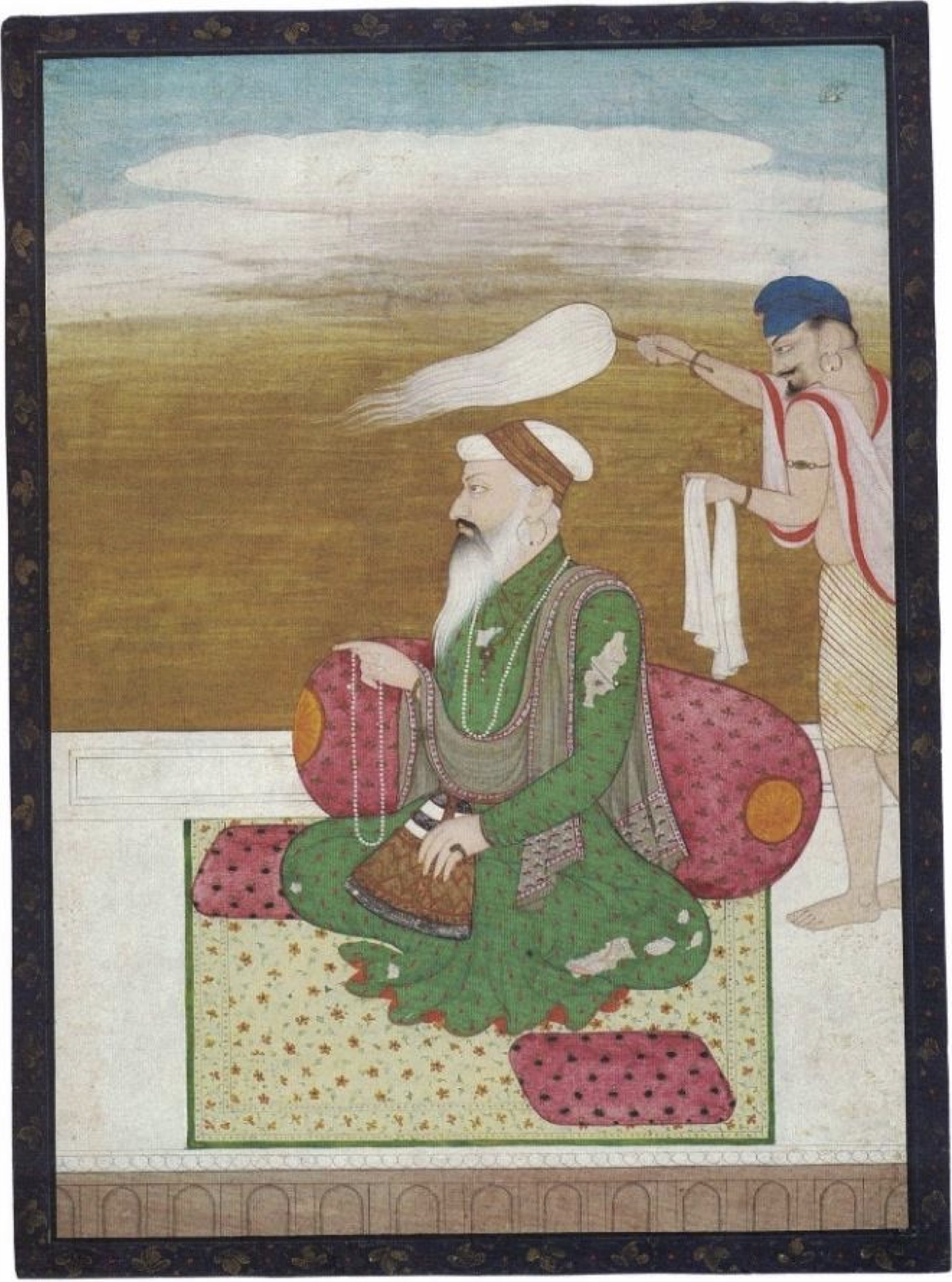
- Guru Ram Das (seated) being fanned by a fly-whisk attendant, family atelier of Nainsukh of Guler, c. 1800

Personal life
- Born: Jetha Mal Sodhi; 24 September 1534 Chuna Mandi, Lahore, Lahore Subah, Mughal Empire
- Died: 1 September 1581 (aged 46) Goindwal, Lahore Subah, Mughal Empire
- Spouse: Bibi Bhani (m. 1553)
- Children: 3, including Prithi Chand and Guru Arjan
- Parents: Hari Das (father); Mata Daya (mother)
- Known for: Founder of Amritsar city
- Other names: Fourth Master; Fourth Nanak

Religious life
- Religion: Sikhism

Religious career
- Based in: Ramdaspur
- Period in office: 1574–1581
- Predecessor: Guru Amar Das
- Successor: Guru Arjan

Guru Ram Das (Gurmukhi: ਗੁਰੂ ਰਾਮ ਦਾਸ, pronunciation: [gʊɾuː ɾaːmᵊ d̯aːsᵊ]; 24 September 1534 – 1 September 1581), sometimes spelled as Guru Ramdas, was the fourth of the ten Sikh gurus. He was born to a family based in Lahore. His birth name was Jetha, and he was orphaned at age seven; he thereafter grew up with his maternal grandmother in a village.

At age 12, Bhai Jetha and his grandmother moved to Goindval, where they met Guru Amar Das, the third leader of Sikhism. The boy accepted the guru as his mentor, served him, and eventually joined his family by marrying his daughter. When it came time for Guru Amar Das to name his successor, he passed over his own sons and chose Bhai Jetha, citing his exemplary service, selfless devotion, and unquestioning obedience.

Renamed Ram Das ("servant of God"), Bhai Jetha became the fourth Guru of Sikhism in 1574. He faced hostility from the sons of Guru Amar Das, and shifted his official base to lands identified by Guru Amar Das as Guru-ka-Chak. He founded the town of Ramdaspur, later renamed Amritsar and known as the holiest city of Sikhism. Unlike the first three Gurus, he appointed his own son as his successor. Whereas the first four Gurus were not related to their predecessors by descent, the fifth through tenth were all direct descendants of Guru Ram Das. He served until his death in 1581.

He is remembered in the Sikh tradition for expanding the manji organization for clerical appointments and donation collections to theologically and economically support the Sikh movement. In a similar light to his predecessor, Guru Ram Das also encouraged widow remarriage.

== Early life ==
=== Family background and life in Lahore ===
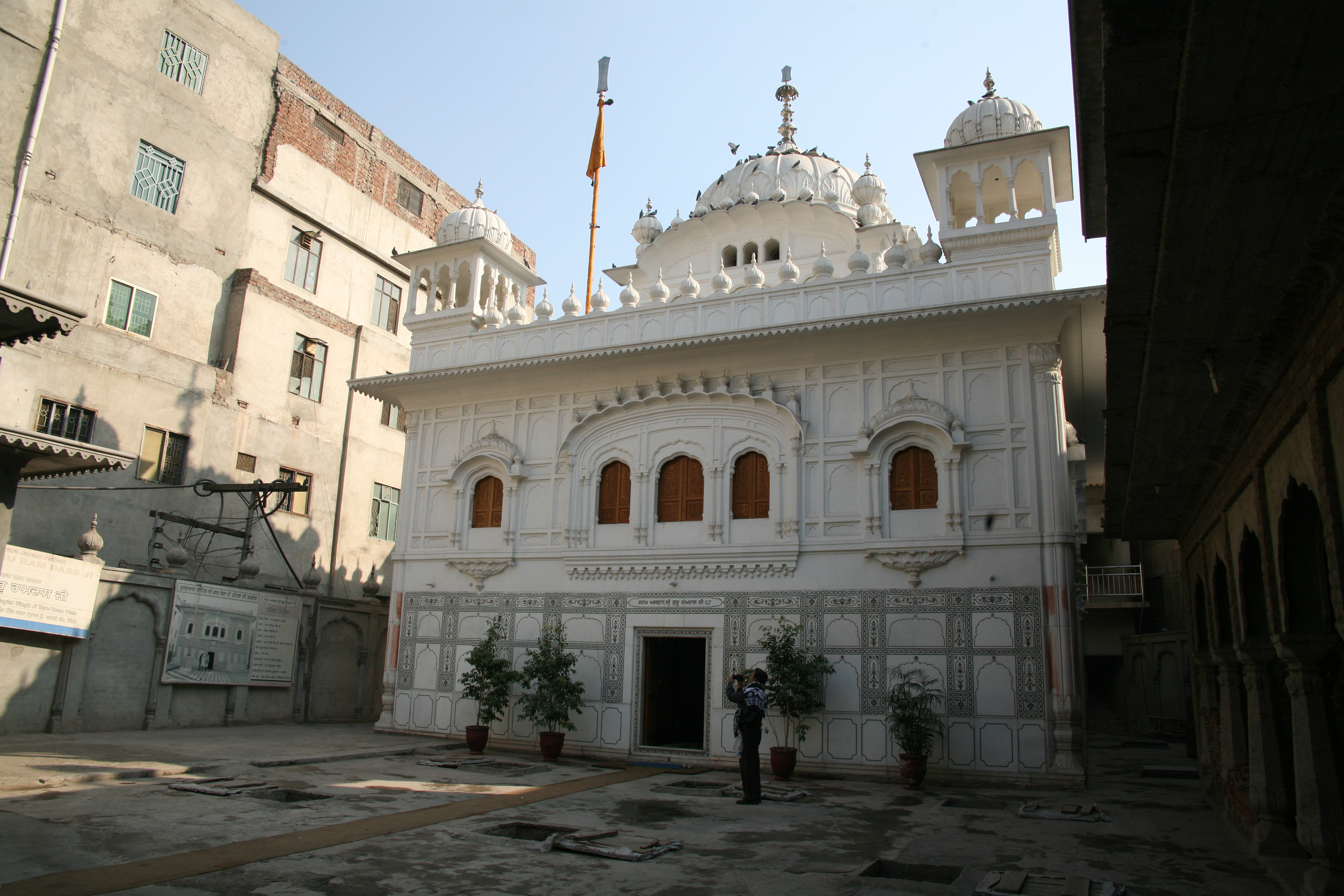
The Gurdwara Janam Asthan Guru Ram Das in Lahore, Pakistan, commemorates the birthplace of the Guru.

Bhai Jetha was born in the morning of 24 September 1534 in a family belonging to the Sodhi gotra (clan) of the Khatri caste in Chuna Mandi, Lahore. His father was Hari Das and his mother was Mata Anup Devi (also known later-on as Anup Kaur or Daya Kaur), both of whom were highly religious. His paternal grandfather was Thakur Das, who was well-known and worked as a shopkeeper in Chuna Mandi, his paternal grandmother was named Jaswanti, and his great-grandfather was Gurdial Sodhi. His father, Hari Das, had inherited the shopkeeper occupation from his own father. His parents had been married for a period of around twelve years before they gave birth to Ram Das. His parents were taunted for being childless during that time. He was named "Jetha" because he was the eldest child among his siblings. Some sources state his actual birthname was still 'Ram Das' and that 'Jetha' was just a nickname he acquired. He had a brother named Hardyal and a sister named Ram Dasi. The place where the building that Ram Das' ancestors constructed was located is now marked by the defunct Gurdwara Dharamsal Patshahi Chauthi and Gurdwara Diwankhana Patshahi Panjvin, now in ruins, located west of Gurdwara Janamasthan Patshahi Chauthi.

Anup Devi would give her son boiled grams to sell at the market. One day, Ram Das instead went to the bank of the Ravi river and fed gathered sanyasis, an episode reminiscent of Guru Nanak's sacha sauda. Both of Jetha's parents died when he was aged around seven. After his parents' deaths, he went into the care of his maternal grandmother.

=== Life as an orphan in Basarke ===
His grandmother took him to her village, Basarke, Jetha lived there for five years. Basarke also happened to coincidentally be the ancestral village of Guru Amar Das. Jetha's grandmother was a destitute lady who faced troubles raising the three orphaned siblings. Prior to becoming a teenager, Ram Das learnt shlokas and mantras and the Vedas and Upanishads, but was left spiritually disastified.

Jetha sold boiled grams, boiled black chickpeas (known as ghugaian), and boiled wheat in the local market square of Basarke to earn a living at the age of around nine. Jetha would sometimes encounter holy-men whilst he was out-and-about working who he would share his provisions of food produce with free-of-cost, being reprimanded by his grandmother for doing so. It is said that when Amar Das just so happened to be visiting Basarke, he came across the young Jetha. Traits that Amar Das saw in the young Jetha that made him take a liking to him was that he was supporting his elderly grandmother at a young age and he lived a deeply spiritual life. Amar Das would meet with Jetha many times in this manner. However, one time when Amar Das was visiting Basarke, he would leave next for Khadur, where his guru, Angad, was based out of. Jetha decided to also make the journey to Khadur.

=== Staying in Khadur and Goindwal ===
Amar Das was then living at Khadur at the sangat (religious congregation) of Guru Angad. Jetha went to Khadur in 1546, attended Guru Angad's sangats, and developed a great liking for the Guru and Amar Das. He frequently partook in the local langar of Khadur. Bhai Jetha spent a lot of his time hawking and selling baklian (boiled corn) when he stayed at Khadur to generate an income for himself. Guru Amar Das eventually visited Basarke again and returned to Goindwal with Bhai Jetha in his company. When Guru Amar Das settled at Goindwal in 1552, Jetha also moved to the new township, and spent most of his time at the guru's durbar (court). One of the activities that Jetha was responsible for at Goindwal was ensuring the utensils used in the langar were cleaned, which he cleaned himself. He was also assigned the role of serving drinking water in the langar, and had been given additional duties related to the pangat. Additionally, he helped with digging work to assist with the construction of a water tank, the Baoli Sahib. He spent time with Guru Amar Das by accompanying him on religious pilgrimages. Under the patronage of Guru Amar Das, Bhai Jetha was educated in North Indian musical tradition.

=== Representing the Sikhs at the Mughal court ===
Before becoming Guru, Jetha represented Guru Amar Das in the Mughal court. Local residents (particularly Brahmins) living around Goindwal lodged a complaint to the local Mughal government of Lahore about the activities of the Sikhs at Goindwal. The Brahmin residents complained and protested about the Sikh tradition of operating a free community kitchen (langar), discarding traditional beliefs and practices, and not recognizing caste divisions and hierarchies. Guru Amar Das sent Jetha to be his representative at the Mughal court on his behalf. Jetha met with emperor Akbar and simply put forth the argument that in the eyes of the divine, all of humankind is equal. This response is said to have pleased Akbar, who dismissed any complaints made against the Sikhs.

=== Marriage ===
In 1553, he married Bibi Bhani, the younger daughter of Amar Das. Jetha was selected personally by Guru Amar Das' wife, Mata Mansa Devi, as the best match for their daughter Bhani due to his devoted and pious personality. They had three sons: Prithi Chand (1554–1623), Mahadev (1559–1656) and Guru Arjan (1563–1606). Jetha's immediate family often protested the work he was doing at the house of his in-laws.

=== Test to become a worthy successor ===
Guru Amar Das designed a test to decide which of his two sons-in-law, Ramo and Jetha, was worthy of being his successor. He requested them to build a platform which befitting for the Sikh guru to be seated upon. Ramo built four platforms but none were to the liking of Guru Amar Das so Ramo gave-up. Jetha constructed seven platforms of his own but also failed to satisfy the Guru, but instead of giving up like Ramo, he submitted himself humbly to the Guru and stated he would continue trying to please him by building a worthy platform for his master, it was this action that made Guru Amar Das decide he was worthy for the guruship mantle. Thus, Jetha was selected as the next Sikh guru and would become known as Guru Ram Das.

== Guruship ==
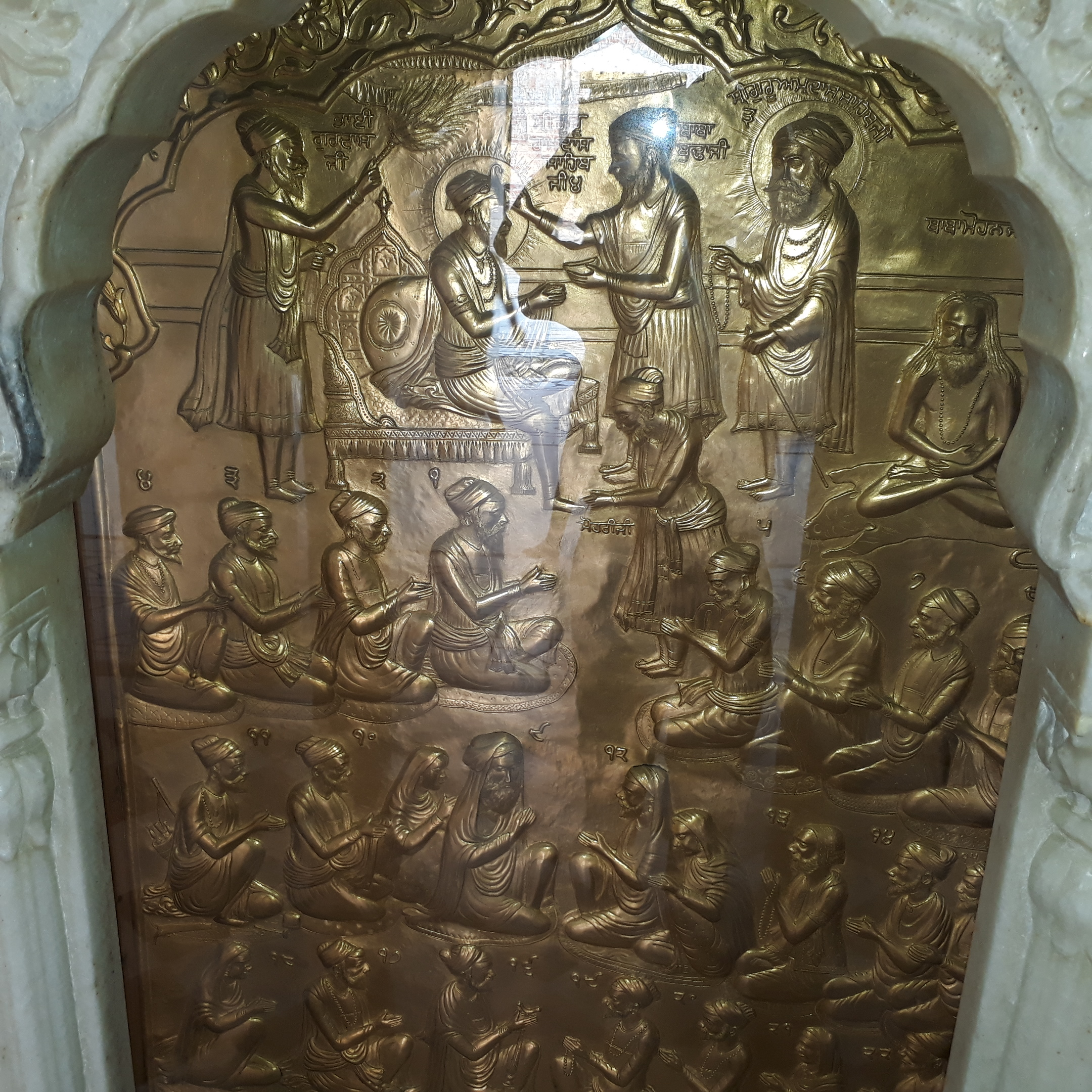
Brass plaque at Gurdwara Chaubara Sahib Goindwal depicting the Gurgadi ceremony of Guru Ramdas being enthroned to Guruship in the presence of Guru Amar Das and regional Manji heads.

Jetha become guru on 30 August 1574, became known as Guru Ram Das, and held the office for seven years.

He was the first of Guru Nanak's successors to rekindle ties with Sri Chand, Nanak's son, after a long period of strained relations between mainstream Sikhs and the Udasis. Sri Chand paid Guru Ram Das a visit in Amritsar, where he was lavishly received by the Guru on the outskirts of the city. When Sri Chand made a comment about Guru Ram Das' long beard, the Guru stated the beard is useful for wiping the feet of saints like him, and got-up to actually wipe the feet of Sri Chand with his beard. Sri Chand then realized why Guru Ram Das was worthy of occupying his father's spiritual seat after witnessing this action.

The Guru was eventually joined by Bhai Gurdas, a familial relative of his predecessor whom was well-educated in religious, linguistic, and literary pursuits. Bhai Gurdas helped advance the Sikh cause during the time of Guru Ram Das.

At some point, local Lahori Sikhs paid a visit to the Guru to engage in Kar Seva voluntary work and petitioned him to find time to pay a visit to his birth city. The Guru visited the city, he was warmly welcomed and gained more followers in the process.

=== Founding of Amritsar and initiation of construction of the Harmandir Sahib complex ===
Guru Ram Das is credited with founding and building the city of Amritsar in the Sikh tradition. Two versions of stories exist regarding the land where Guru Ram Das settled. In one based on a Gazetteer record, the land was purchased with Sikh donations, for 700 rupees from the owners of the village of Tung.

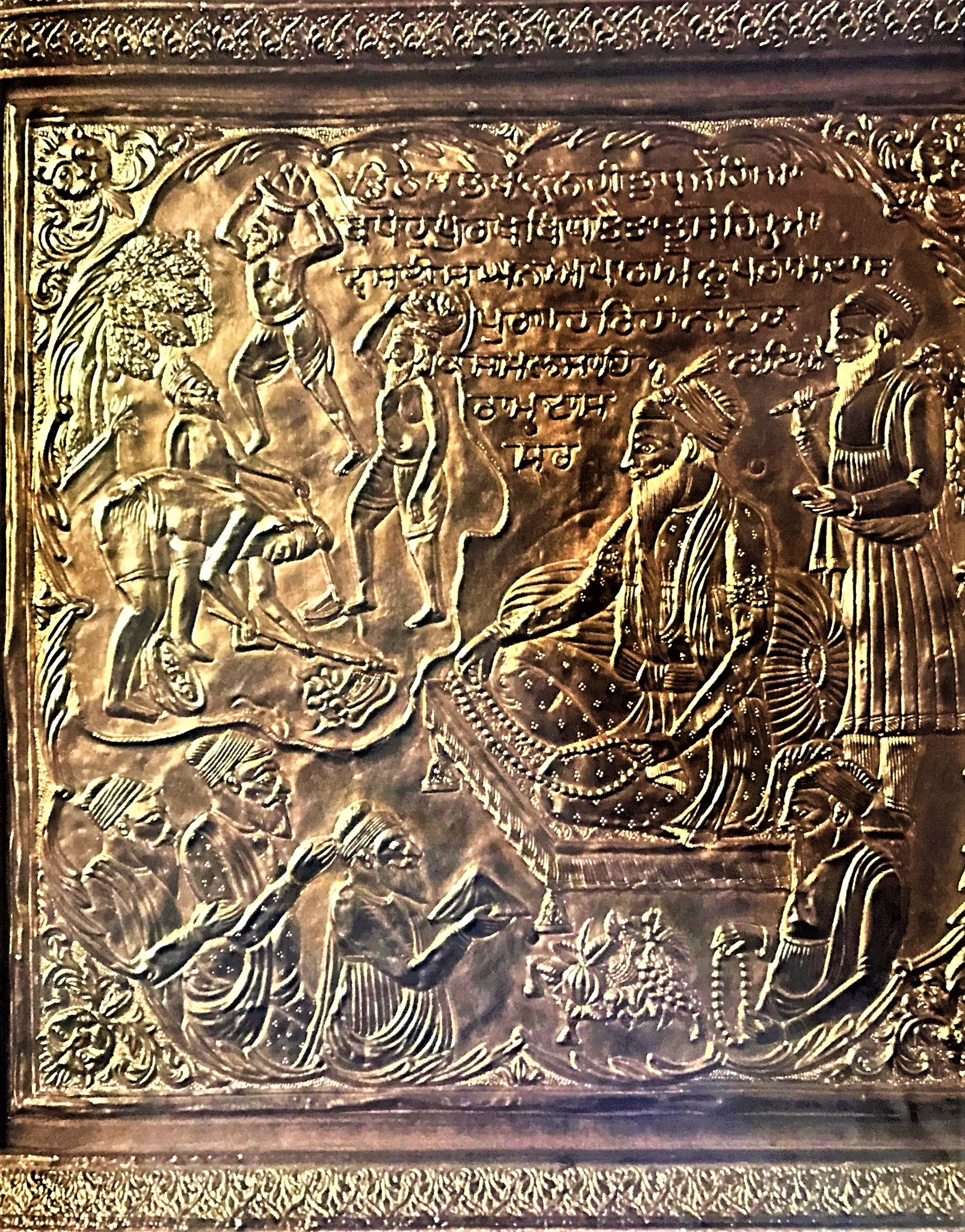
Repoussé plaque depicting Guru Ram Das, overseeing enlargement of the pond at Guru ka Chak (later becoming the 'Sarovar' or holy temple tank of the Golden Temple)

According to the Sikh historical records, the site was chosen by Guru Amar Das and called Guru Da Chakk, after he had asked Guru Ram Das to find land to start a new town with a man made pool as its central point. After his coronation in 1574, and the hostile opposition he faced from the sons of Guru Amar Das, Guru Ram Das founded the town named after him as "Ramdaspur". He started by completing the pool, and building his new official Guru centre and home next to it. He invited merchants and artisans from other parts of India to settle into the new town with him. The town expanded during the time of Guru Arjan financed by donations and constructed by voluntary work. The town grew to become the city of Amritsar, and the pool area grew into a temple complex after his son built the Gurdwara Harmandir Sahib, and installed the scripture of Sikhism inside the new gurdwara in 1604.

The construction activity between 1574 and 1604 is described in Mahima Prakash Vartak, a semi-historical Sikh hagiographical text likely composed in 1741, and the earliest known document dealing with the lives of all the ten Gurus.

As per the instruction of his predecessor, Guru Ram Das also constructed two man-made pools of holy water (known as sarovars) in Guru-Da-Chak, with their names being Ramdas Sarovar and Amritsar Sarovar.

=== Literary works ===
Guru Ram Das composed 638 hymns, or about ten percent of hymns in the Guru Granth Sahib. He was a celebrated poet, and composed his work in 30 ancient ragas of Indian classical music.

These cover a range of topics:

One who calls himself to be a disciple of the Guru should rise before dawn and meditate on the Lord's Name. During the early hours, he should rise and bathe, cleansing his soul in a tank of nectar [water], while he repeats the Name the Guru has spoken to him. By this procedure he truly washes away the sins of his soul. – GGS 305 (partial)

The Name of God fills my heart with joy. My great fortune is to meditate on God's name. The miracle of God's name is attained through the perfect Guru, but only a rare soul walks in the light of the Guru's wisdom. – GGS 94 (partial)

O man! The poison of pride is killing you, blinding you to God. Your body, the colour of gold, has been scarred and discoloured by selfishness. Illusions of grandeur turn black, but the ego-maniac is attached to them. – GGS 776 (partial)

— Guru Granth Sahib, Translated by G. S. Mansukhani

His compositions continue to be sung daily in Harmandir Sahib (Golden temple) of Sikhism.

==== Wedding hymn ====
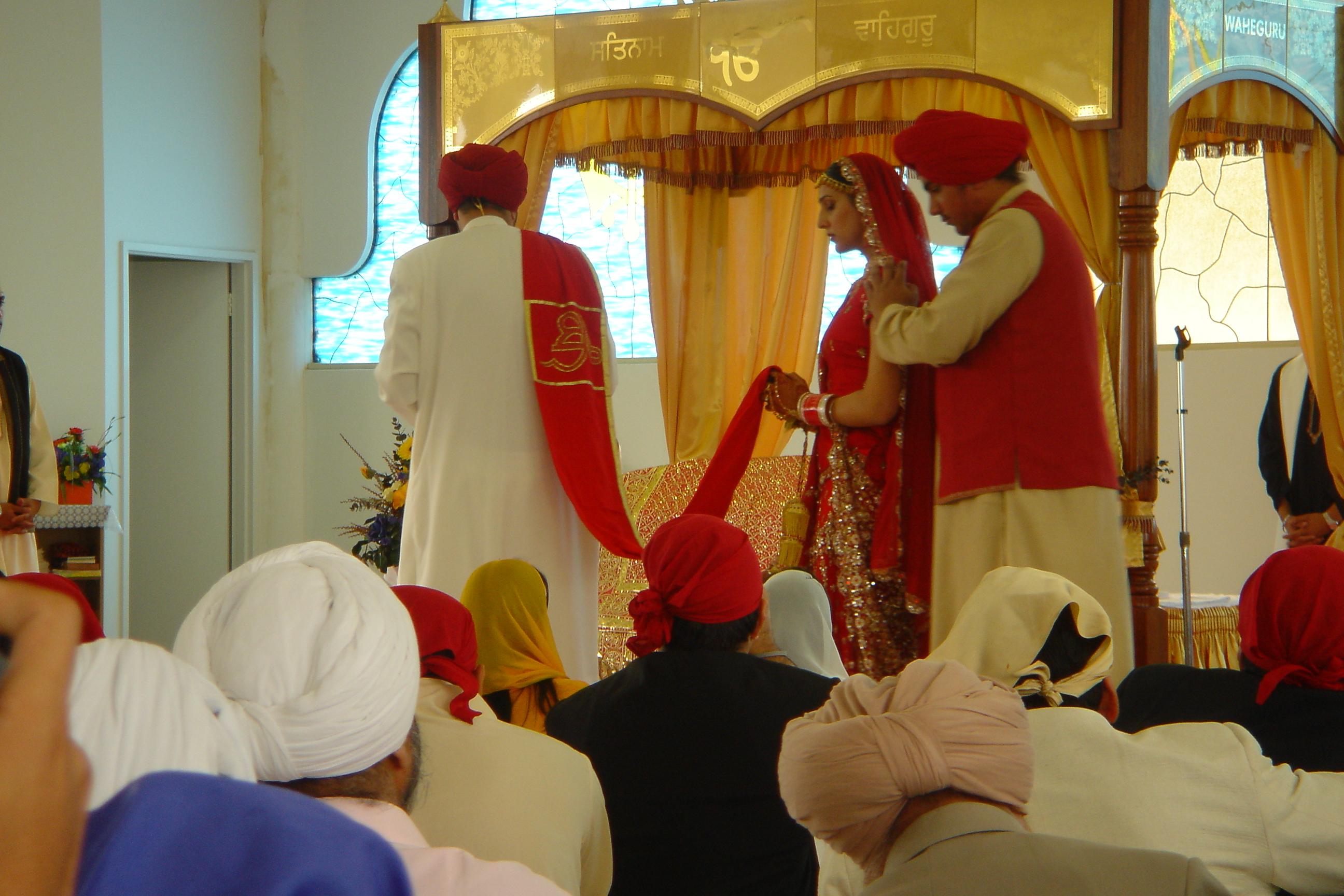
The laavan verses of Guru Ram Das are recited with clockwise circumambulation around Guru Granth Sahib in a Sikh wedding.

Guru Ram Das, along with Guru Amar Das, is credited with various parts of the Anand and Laavan composition in Suhi mode. It is a part of the ritual of four clockwise circumambulations of the Sikh scripture by the bride and groom to solemnize their marriage in the Sikh tradition. This was intermittently used, and its use lapsed in late 18th century. However, sometime in 19th or 20th century, by conflicting accounts, the composition of Guru Ram Das came back in use along with the Anand Karaj ceremony, replacing the Hindu ritual of circumambulation around the fire. The composition of Guru Ram emerged to be one of the bases of the British colonial era Anand Marriage Act of 1909.

The first stanza of the Laavan hymn by Guru Ram Das refers to the duties of the householder's life to accept the Guru's word as guide, remember the Divine Name. The second verse and circle remind the singular One is encountered everywhere and in the depths of the self. The third speaks of the Divine Love. The fourth reminds that the union of the two is the union of the individual with the Infinite.

=== Masand system ===
While Guru Amar Das introduced the manji system of religious organization, Guru Ram Das extended it with adding the masand institution. After a suggestion by Baba Buddha to venture into new potentials for generating funds, Guru Ram Das came-up with the Masand missionary system. The masand were Sikh community leaders and preachers who lived far from the Guru in distant parts of the subcontinent and beyond, but acted to lead the distant congregations, their mutual interactions and collect revenue for Sikh activities and Gurudwara building. This institutional organization famously helped grow Sikhism in the decades that followed, but became infamous in the era of later Gurus, for its corruption and its misuse in financing rival Sikh movements in times of succession disputes. However, the early Masand leaders tended to be hardworking and committed Sikhs.

=== Selection of a successor ===
The Guru's three sons had distinctive roles and personality traits: Prithi Chand was responsible for ensuring the smooth operation of the langar, keeping records, and overseeing appropriate accommodation for visitors; Mahadev was a deeply spiritual individual who had no interest in worldly affairs and preferred to be by himself; and Arjan Dev was the youngest but deeply pious and viewed his father truly as a spiritual teacher and role-model to emulate.

Guru Ram Das had a cousin named Sehari Mal who visited the Guru from Lahore and invited him to his son's marriage ceremony. However, the Guru was busy and would be unable to attend the marriage and thus requested his eldest son Prithi Chand go on his behalf to represent him. Prithi refused to go as he believed that being separated from the Guru lessened his chances of being selected as his successor. However, Prithi used the excuse that he was too engrossed and concerned with the operation of the langar, fund acquisition, and other responsibilities, to be able to go to Lahore for the marriage ceremony. Mahadev was not interested in worldly occasions like marriage events and declined to go. Arjan Dev on the other hand willingly accepted the request to represent his father at Lahore. Arjan Dev stayed at Lahore for a few days waiting for a message from his father approving of his return but the message never came. He eventually waited for around a month and still received no word from his father. Arjan authored two letters written poetically to his father to inquire about the situation but still received no reply. He then sent a third letter but specifically ordered the courier to hand the letter over to the Guru himself and not let it pass into anyone else's hands. This third letter was successfully received by the Guru and it was discovered that it was Prithi Chand who had been stealing the letters and preventing their deliverance. The Guru managed to obtain the prior two letters that had gone undelivered due to them being hidden by Prithi.

Guru Ram Das took a great liking to the three letters written in verse by his son Arjan and requested his other sons write poetic letters like them. However, Arjan was thrilled to be reunited with his father and decided to write yet another and fourth letter in verse, which won over the heart of his father and made him decide to select his youngest son Arjan as his worthy successor.

== Death and succession ==
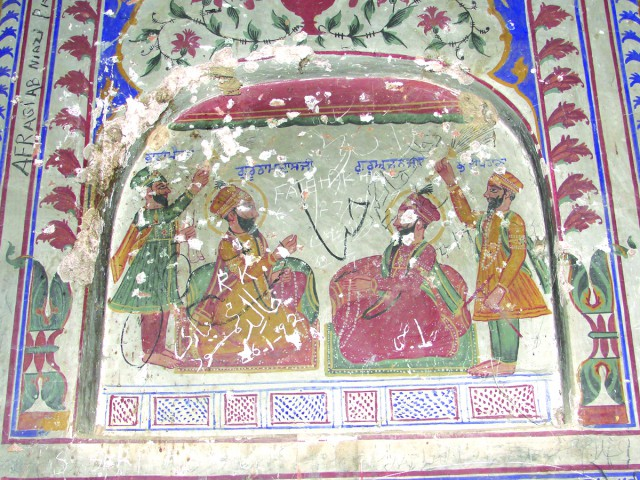
Guru Ram Das (centre-left) with Guru Arjan (centre-right). Fresco located at Kot Fateh Khan, Attock, Pakistan

Guru Ram Das died on 1 September 1581, in Goindwal, he nominated his younger son, Arjan Dev, as his successor. The Guru's eldest son Prithi Chand vehemently protested against his father suppression. The second son Mahadev did not press his claim. Prithi Chand used offensive language to his father, and then informed Baba Budhha that his father had acted inappropriately; the guruship was his own right. He vowed that he would remove Guru Arjan, and make himself the Guru. Later Prithi Chand created a rival faction which the Sikhs following Guru Arjan called Minas literally, "scoundrels"), and is alleged to have attempted to assassinate young Hargobind. However, alternate competing texts written by the Prithi Chand led Sikh faction to offer a different story, contradict this explanation on Hargobind's life, and present the elder son of Guru Ram Das as devoted to his younger brother Guru Arjan. The competing texts do acknowledge disagreement and describe Prithi Chand as having become the Sahib Guru after the martyrdom of Guru Arjan Dev and disputing the succession of Guru Hargobind, the grandson of Guru Ram Das.

== Literature ==
Guru Ram Das composed written works, which is preserved in the Guru Granth Sahib, known as gurbani. His style differs from that of his predecessor, whilst Guru Amar Das had a more conservative approach, possibly due to his older-age, the younger Guru Ram Das was more innovative in his poetry, such as the addition of new rāgs that the hymns were set to, where as Guru Amar Das utilized the same set of rāgs that Guru Nanak had employed in his compositions, and Guru Ram Das composing innovating rhythms. Furthermore, while the works of earlier gurus freely borrowed Persianate vocabulary, the works of Guru Ram Das show a move toward Sanskritic and Hindi vocabulary.

Bhai Jetha was already a trailblazer in Sikh literature; since he is the only Guru who has been featured in any of the pothis before becoming a Guru. The Goindwal Pothis all have neatly crossed out sections, which were done at a later point, in which there are fourteen songs by a man named Ghulam Sadasevak. It had confused many Sikh historians for centuries as it was the first time one had crossed out previously accepted canon. Ghulam Sadasevak is a Persian and Sanskrit pen-name, meaning "eternal servant of the Lord". In the Pinjore Pothi, within the hashiya (decorative margin), there is a title saying, "Your intoxicated slave, Jeth Chand", Jeth Chand being Guru Ram Das. The mainstreaming of a non-Guru in religious literature is very unusual, though it is possible Guru Amar Das had added the songs after it was declared Bhai Jetha was going to be the next Guru. The other possibility is that Bhai Jetha as a devotee wrote the songs and it was transcribed into the Pinjore pothi from his personal handbook. Though it is quite clear that while the songs were written, Bhai Jetha does not claim the position or persona of Guru Nanak (as did all Gurus, including Guru Ram Das after his Guruship), but devotes the beginning of the final verse to Guru Nanak.

== Gallery ==
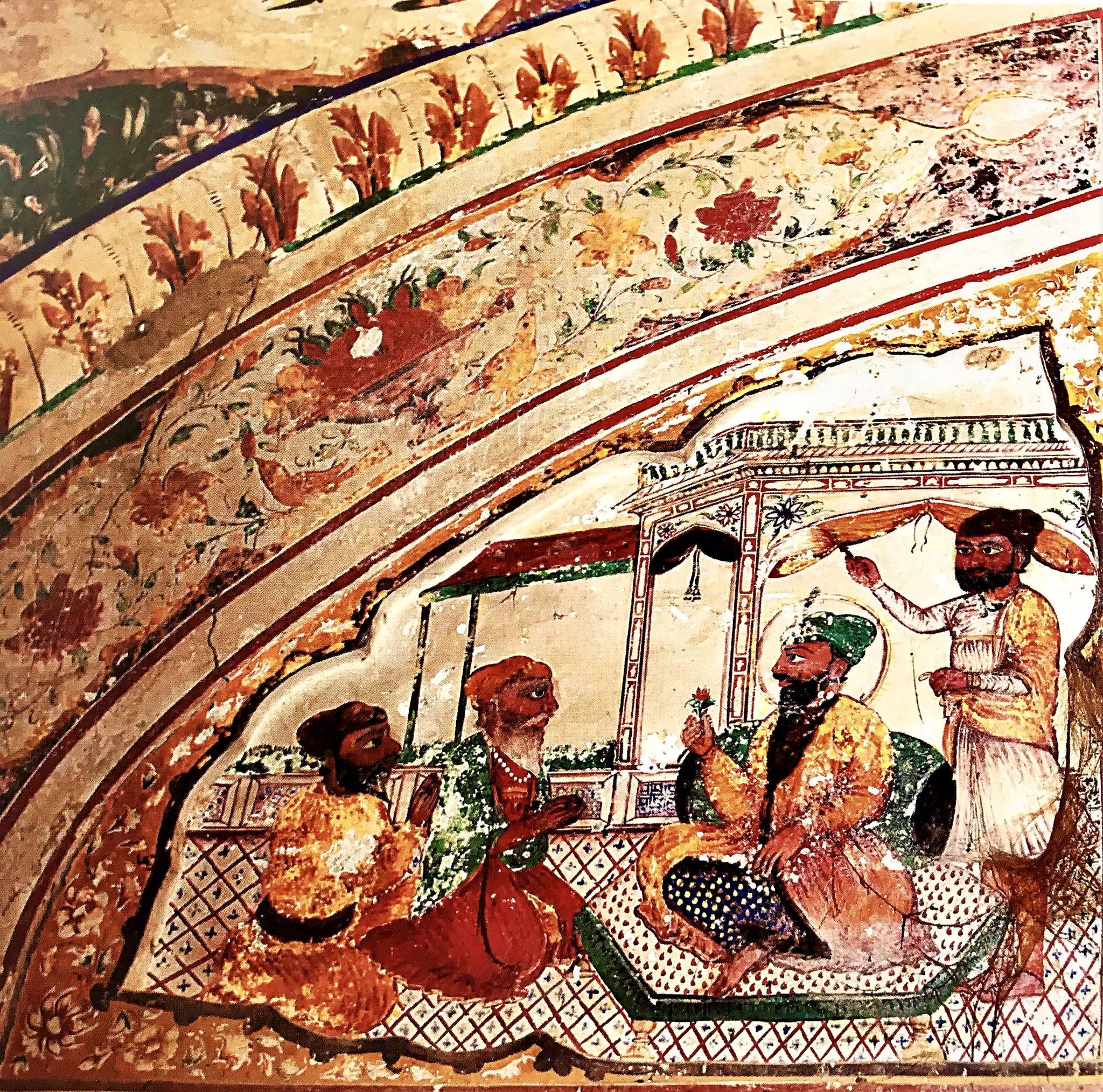
Guru Ram Das fresco from a Samadh at an Udhasi Darbar.

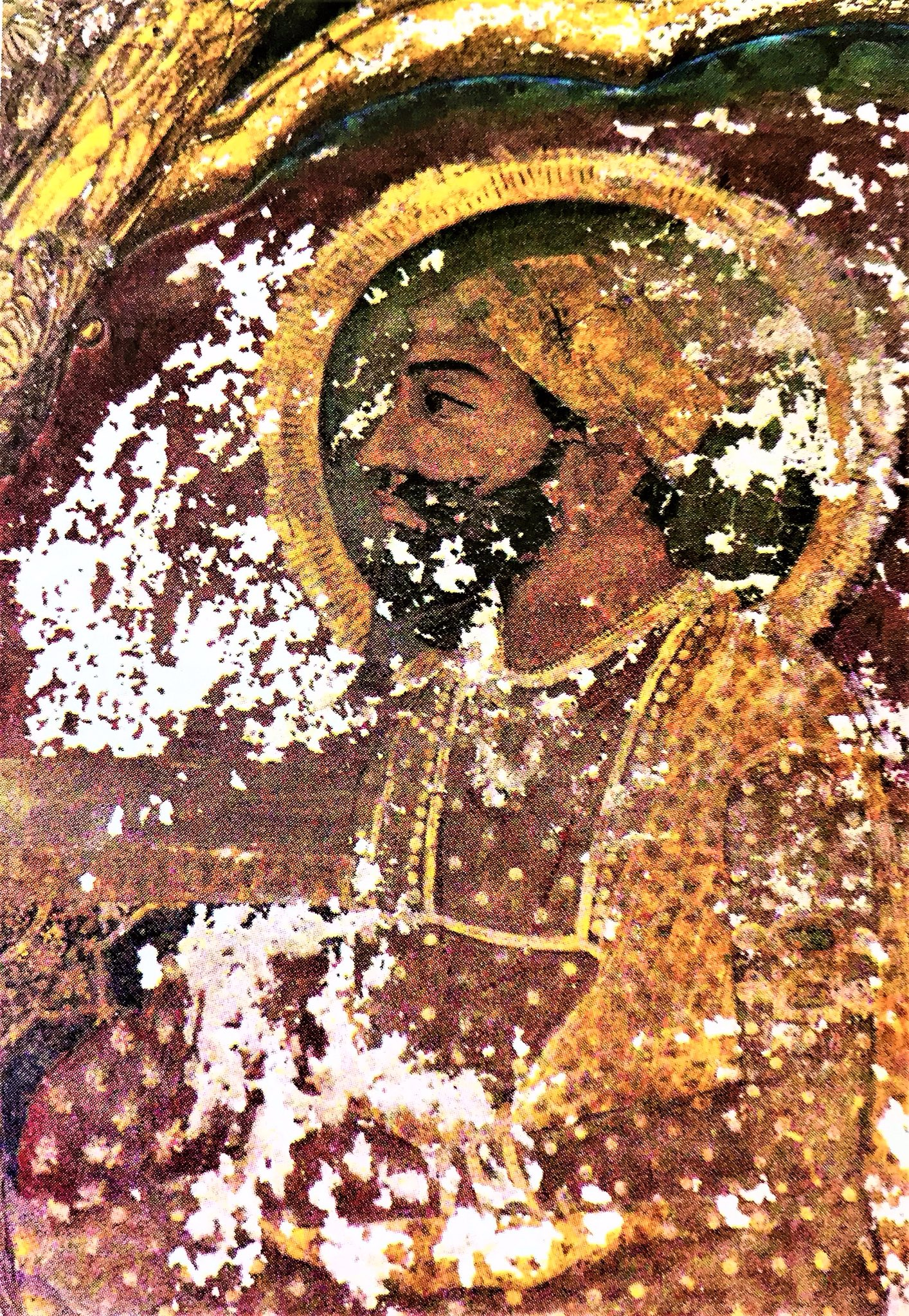
Guru Ram Das fresco from the Samadhi of Maharaja Ranjit Singh, Lahore.

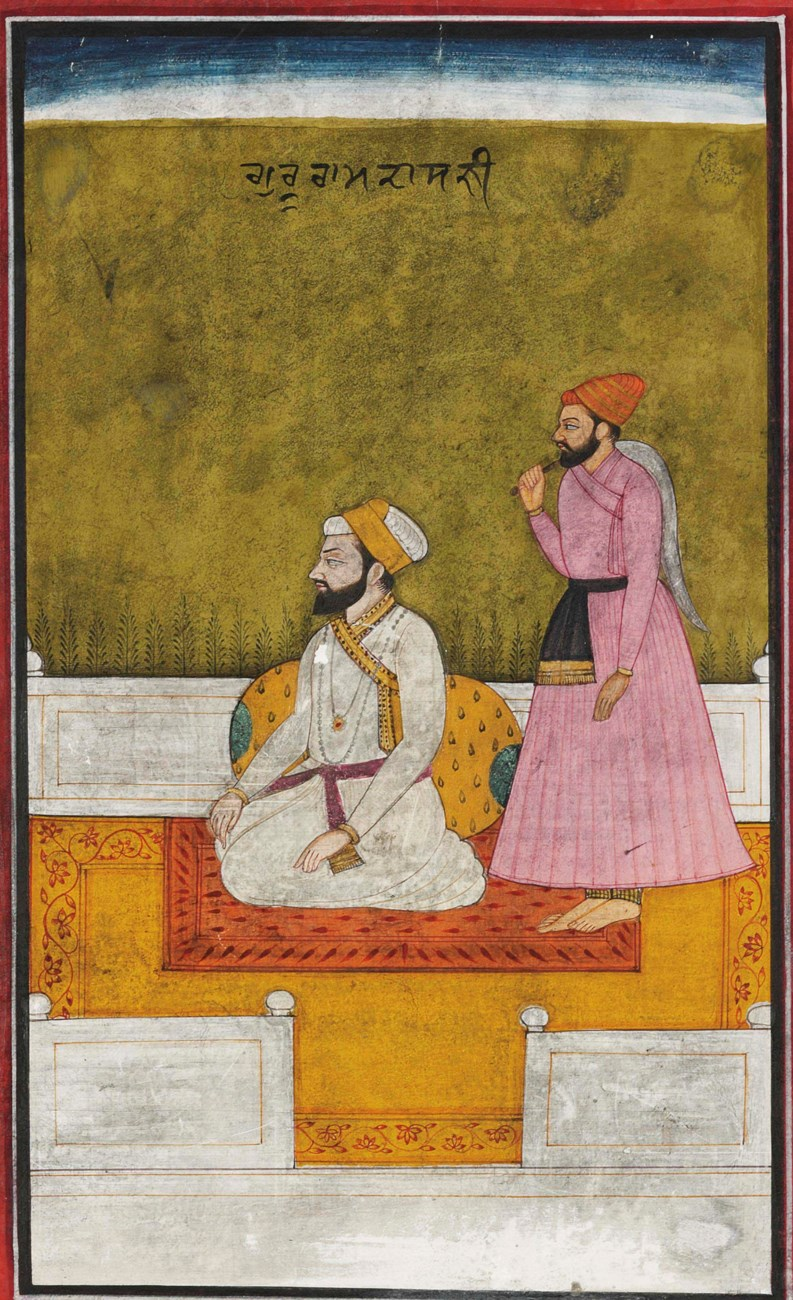
Guru Ram Das painting from Rajasthan.

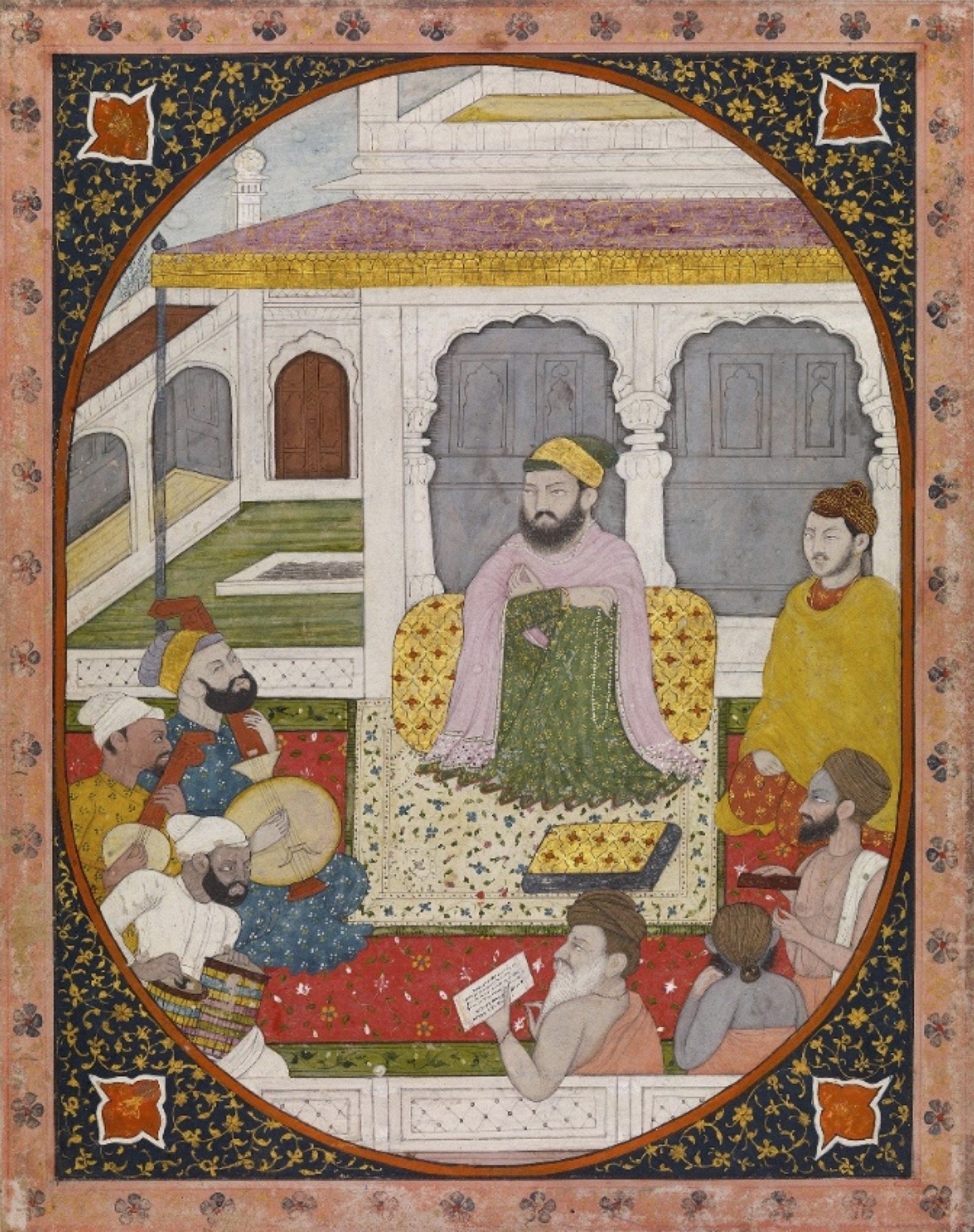
Guru Ramdas painting.

== Cited sources ==
- Fenech, Louis E.; W. H. McLeod (2014). Historical Dictionary of Sikhism. Rowman & Littlefield. ISBN 978-1-4422-3601-1.

Preceded by Guru Amar Das	Sikh Guru; 1 September 1574 – 1 September 1581	Succeeded by Guru Arjan
