= Nawaz Sharif Medical College =

Public medical college in Gujrat, Pakistan

Nawaz Sharif Medical College نواز شریف طبی کالج
- Type: Public sector
- Established: September 2008
- Affiliations: University of Gujrat; University of Health Sciences, Lahore; Pakistan Medical Commission; College of Physicians and Surgeons Pakistan
- Principal: Professor Dr. Tahir Siddique
- Location: Jalalpur Jattan Gujrat, Punjab, Pakistan
- Campus: Urban 62 acres (250,000 m^{2})
- Colors: Yellow and blue
- Website: uog.edu.pk/en//university/nsmc

Nawaz Sharif Medical College (Urdu:نواز شریف طبی کالج) is a medical school located in Gujrat, Punjab, Pakistan.

It was a constituent college of the University of Gujrat until 2022. As of 1 January 2022 NSMC, Gujrat, is administratively, financially administered by the Government of Punjab through the Specialized Healthcare & Medical Education Department, Lahore. It offers a MBBS degree in affiliation with the University of Health Sciences, Lahore. NSMC is accredited by the Pakistan Medical & Dental Council (PM&DC) Islamabad. It is recognized by the College of Physicians and Surgeons Pakistan (CPSP) for postgraduate training programs. The college is listed in the International Medical Education Directory (IMED).

== History ==
Chief Minister of the Punjab Mian Muhammad Shahbaz Sharif inaugurated the college in September 2008. Nawaz Sharif Medical College, Gujrat, is a public sector medical college. Its construction was started by previous Chief Minister of Punjab, Parvez Elahi, before Mian Shahbaz Shareef took office and inaugurated it. It was established to provide medical education and healthcare facilities for the industrial regions of Jhelum, Gujranwala, Sialkot and Gujrat. The principals of the college are as follows:

- Dr Nasir Aziz Kamboh (to 2013)
- Professor Dr. Sajjad Hussain (to 2015)
- Professor Dr. Zafar Iqbal Gill (to 2017)
- Professor Dr. Miraj Us Siraj (to 2018)
- Professor Dr. Muhammad Ateeq (to 2019)
- Dr. Zafar Iqbal Gill (to 2022)
- Professor Dr. Maroof Aziz Khan (to 2022)
- Professor Dr. Ajmal Farooq (February 2023 – May 2024)
- Professor Dr. Tahir siddique (2 May 2024 – 30 June 2025)
- Professor Dr. Rehman Gulzar (1 July 2025 – present)

== Campus ==
The college is housed in one of the blocks of the University of Gujrat. On 15 March 2012, Chief Minister Shahbaz Sharif visited the college and approved the construction of a new building for the college adjacent to the university. The new campus spans 62 acres.

== Departments ==
- Basic science departments
  - Anatomy
  - Biochemistry
  - Community medicine
  - Forensic medicine
  - Pathology
  - Pharmacology
  - Physiology
- Medicine and allied departments
  - Cardiology
  - Dermatology
  - Endocrinology & Metabolism
  - General medicine
  - Neurology
  - Pediatrics
  - Preventive medicine
  - Psychiatry
  - Pulmonology (Chest medicine)
  - Radiotherapy
  - Urology
- Surgery and allied departments
  - Anesthesiology
  - Cardiac surgery
  - Cosmetic surgery
  - General surgery
  - Neurosurgery
  - Obstetrics and gynaecology
  - Ophthalmology
  - Oral and maxillofacial surgery
  - Orthopedics
  - Otorhinolaryngology
  - Pediatric surgery
  - Radiology
- Administrative departments
  - IT Department

== Admission policy ==
The college admits 90 students on open merit. Admission is granted through the annual admission test NMDCAT, conducted by the University of Health Sciences, Lahore / PM&DC. Ten seats were reserved for foreign students, specifically children of overseas Pakistanis and dual nationality holders of Pakistani origin, which students can apply for through the HEC.

== Teaching hospital ==
Aziz Bhatti Shaheed Hospital is attached to Nawaz Sharif Medical College as a teaching hospital. It has almost 700 beds capacity. A new building has recently been added to the hospital.

== Library ==
Besides the main library, there are four constituent college libraries. There are about 90,000 books available in all five libraries. A wide variety of online full-text journals' databases are available, including Higher Education Commission (Pakistan) (HEC) and Pakistan Education and Research Network (PERN) project. Thousands of digital books can be accessed through the library website on a variety of subjects.

== See also ==
- List of medical schools in Pakistan
