= Government Fatima Jinnah College for Women =

Women's college in Lahore, Pakistan

Government Fatima Jinnah College for Women is an autonomous women's college in Chuna Mandi, Lahore, Punjab. Before establishment of the college, the building was a haveli and was known as Dhyan Singh Haveli, or Asif Jah Haveli.

== History ==
The building of the college is 400 years old and was built by Abu'l-Hasan Asaf Khan, the Grand Vizier (Prime Minister) of the Mughal emperor Jahangir. It was also used by Dhian Singh, a wazir of the Sikh Empire. After the British defeated the Sikh Empire, the building was taken over and used as the office of assistant commissioner.

In 1864, the haveli was used by the Government College, Lahore and the Oriental College, Lahore for the preliminary classes. In 1871, the Government College, Lahore was shifted to a new building and the haveli was converted into Dhiyan Singh School which was renamed in 1947 as City Muslim League High School.

In 1986, it was converted into a college named after Fatima Jinnah, Government Fatima Jinnah College for Women, by then Punjab Chief Minister Nawaz Sharif.

== See also ==
- University of Gujrat
