= Chuna Mandi =

Historic neighbourhood and market located in the old walled-city of Lahore, Pakistan

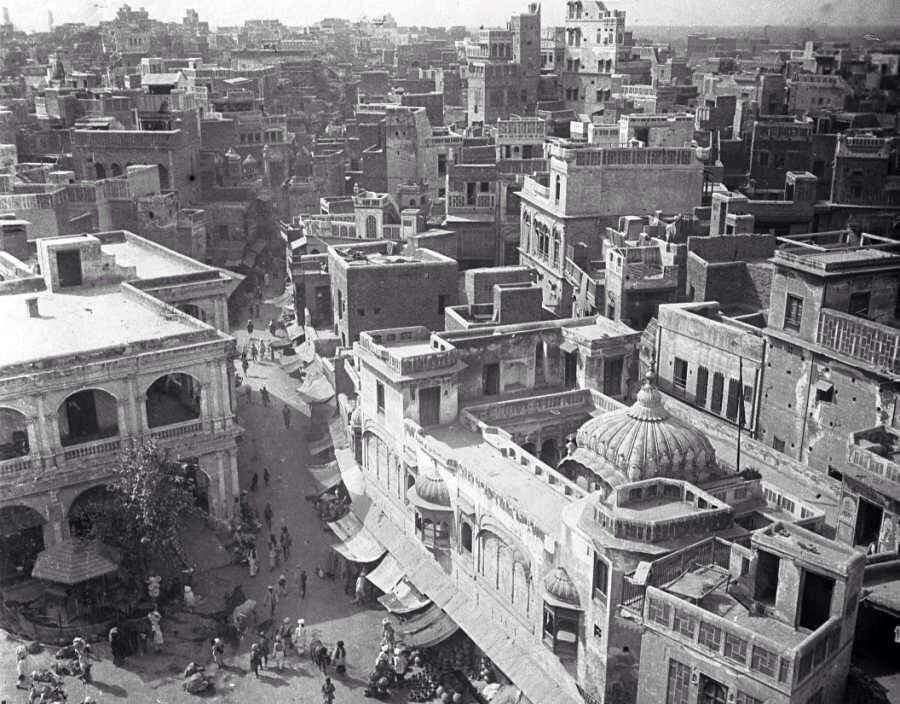
Photograph of the neighbourhood of Chuna Mandi in Lahore, Punjab, c.1910s

Chuna Mandi, also spelt as Choona Mandi, is a historic locality within the old Walled City of Lahore in Punjab, Pakistan. A number of historical figures are said to have resided in the area, such as Mughal emperors Akbar, and Jahangir two Sikh gurus, as well as Asif Jah, Khushal Singh, and Dhian Singh.

== Etymology ==
According to Harish Dhillon, the name of the locality comes from the word chuna, meaning lime, which was used as a construction material as mortar, combined with the word mandi (marketplace).

== History ==
According to Syad Muhammad Latif, the locality was originally classified as being a part of the Mohalla Sheikh Ishaq, alongside the Moti Bazaar. The area historically was associated with business and commerce, especially associated with the lime trade, with its streets being lined with many shops. The neighbourhood is linked to Sikhism, as it was the birthplace of the fourth Sikh guru, Guru Ram Das in September 1534. Guru Ram Das' grandfather and father, Thakar Das and Hari Das, were shop-keepers in Chuna Mandi. It was also the location where Guru Arjan, son of Guru Ram Das and the fifth guru, is believed to have lived for two-years while attending a relative's wedding. In 1801, Maharaja Ranjit Singh constructed a gurdwara commemorating Guru Ram Das on the occasion of the birth of his son, Kharak Singh.

Aside from Sikh gurdwaras, the neighbourhood contains a number of heritage structures, principally havelis. The area contains the largest, extant haveli located within the walled-city, the Choona Mandi Complex or Choona Mandi Haveli, which consists of Mughal, Sikh, and British architectural elements and constructions. The haveli-complex formerly housed the Central Investigation Agency (CIA) of the Punjab Police. It is now a girls' college managed by the Education Department. The haveli of Khushal Singh, popularly known as the Dhyan Singh Haveli or Asif Jah Haveli, is located in the neighbourhood. The actual haveli of Dhian Singh is instead located in the Ghalla Mandi (Grain Market) of Lahore, near Heera Mandi.

== Landmarks located within the area ==
- Government Fatima Jinnah College for Women
- Gurdwara Janam Asthan Guru Ram Das
