= Kala Chak =

Coordinates: 32°36′34″N 74°08′57″E

Kala Chak کالا چک
- Interactive map of Kala Chak
- Country: Pakistan
- Province: Punjab
- District: Gujrat
- Time zone: UTC+5 (PST)
- Calling code: 053

Kala Chak (Urdu: کالا چک) is a village in Gujrat District, of the Punjab province, Pakistan. It is situated near Sook Khurd, about 7 kilometres (4.3 miles) north of Gujrat city.
