= Maroof, Gujrat =

Coordinates: 32°37′19″N 74°10′14″E

Maroof (Faizabad) (فیض آباد)معروف
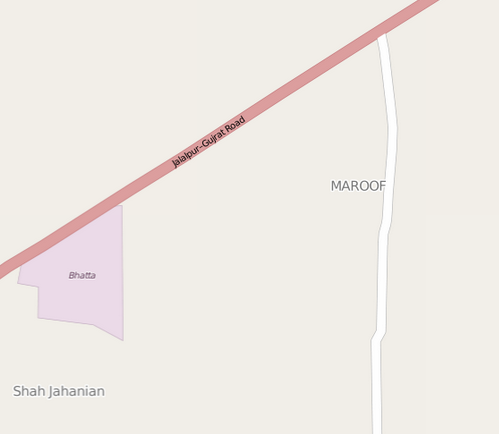
- Location of Maroof alongside Jalalpur–Gujrat Road
- Country: Pakistan
- Province: Punjab
- District: Gujrat

Government
  - Chouhdary: چوہدری عنصر الطاف

Area
  - Total: 9 km^{2} (3.5 sq mi)

Population
  - Total: 2,045
- Time zone: UTC+5 (PST)
- Calling code: 053

Maroof (Faizabad) (Urdu: معروف) is a village situated on Jalalpur–Gujrat Road in Gujrat District, in the Punjab province of Pakistan.
