= Kulachor =

Kulachor کلاچور
- Location of Kulachor Kulachor (Pakistan)
- Country: Pakistan
- Province: Punjab
- District: Gujrat
- City: Jalalpur Jattan
- Time zone: UTC+5 (PST)
- Calling code: 053

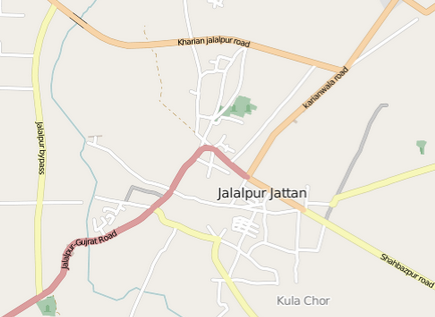
Kulachor in Jalalpur Jattan map

Kulachor (Urdu: کلاچور) is a town adjacent to Jalalpur Jattan in Gujrat District, of Punjab, Pakistan. It is situated about 16 kilometers northeast of Gujrat city. It was built as a city by Chandragupta Maurya in 300 BC.
