= Moinuddinpur =

Coordinates: 32°35′06″N 74°06′32″E

Moomdi Pur معین الدین پور سیداں
- Moin UD Din Pur Syedan
- Interactive map of Moomdi Pur
- Country: Pakistan
- Province: Punjab
- District: Gujrat
- Time zone: UTC+5 (PST)
- Calling code: 053

Moin-UD-Din Pur (Urdu:معین الدین پور سیداں), known locally as Moomdi Pur, is a village located on the outskirts of Gujrat city in the Gujrat District, of the Punjab province, Pakistan.

== History ==
Moin-ud-Din Pur is a small village in Gujrat, Pakistan. Centuries ago, Syed Moin-ud-Din Shah, founded the village. He was a direct descendant of Muhammad S.W and belonged to the Khwarizmi clan, which traces back to one of the biggest Muslim empires ruled by the Shah of Khwarizm.

The ancestors of Syed Moin-ud-Din, migrated from Arabia due to persecution by the Umayyads, who targeted them for being from the lineage of the Ahl al-Bayt. Despite the passage of time and changes in ruling dynasties, their persecution persisted. They sought refuge in the empire of the Shah of Khwarizm.

After the destruction of Khwarizm by Genghis Khan, the survivors, now identifying as the Khwarizmi Syed clan, scattered in search of refuge. They settled temporarily in Tulamba near Multan before arriving at the empire of Jalaluddin Akbar. They settled in what is now present-day Gujrat on the banks of the Chenab River. Due to their lineage as descendants of Muhammad S.W, the three brothers were respected by the Emperor and granted large tracts of land for permanent settlement.

In the 17th century, the land was divided, and settlements such as Jamalpur and Medina, along with the village Moin-ud-Din Pur, emerged. The Syeds from Gujrat are mainly Khwarizmi’s whose forefather migrated to Multan from the Central Asian state of Khwarizm near the Aral Sea when the Delhi Sultanate was established.

One of their descendants, Syed Nizam-Ud-Din Tulambi, moved to Gujrat in the 15th century. There are three Syedan towns in Gujrat whose inhabitants take their lineage back to Syed Nizam-Ud-Din Tulambi: Jamalpur Syedan, Madina Syedan and Moinuddinpur Syedan.

== Famous People ==
Many individuals from Moomdi Pur have risen to prominent positions at the national level in Pakistan, as well as in fields such as education, civil services, medicine, engineering, business, and public service.

=== Qasim Ali Shah ===
Qasim Ali Shah is an educationist, motivational speaker, and entrepreneur in Pakistan, known contributions on youth development and personal growth. He is the founder and chairman of Qasim Ali Shah Foundation, an organization dedicated to education, character building, and leadership training. Through his books, seminars, workshops, and widely followed digital platforms, he has inspired millions to pursue education, discipline, and purpose-driven lives. Known for his practical wisdom, ethical values, and ability to connect with people from all walks of life, Qasim Ali Shah has played a significant role in shaping mindsets and motivating individuals to strive for excellence at both personal and national levels.

Qasim Ali Shah, was born in Moomdi Pur, and spent his early life there. Growing up in this environment played an important role in shaping his values, discipline, and passion for education. From Moomdi Pur, he began his journey toward knowledge, self-development, and leadership, eventually rising to national prominence. His success stands as a powerful example for the younger generation and reflects the strong educational and moral foundations of the village.
