= Hafiz Hayat =

Coordinates: 32°38′20.5″N 74°10′8.1″E

Hafiz Hayat حافظ حیات
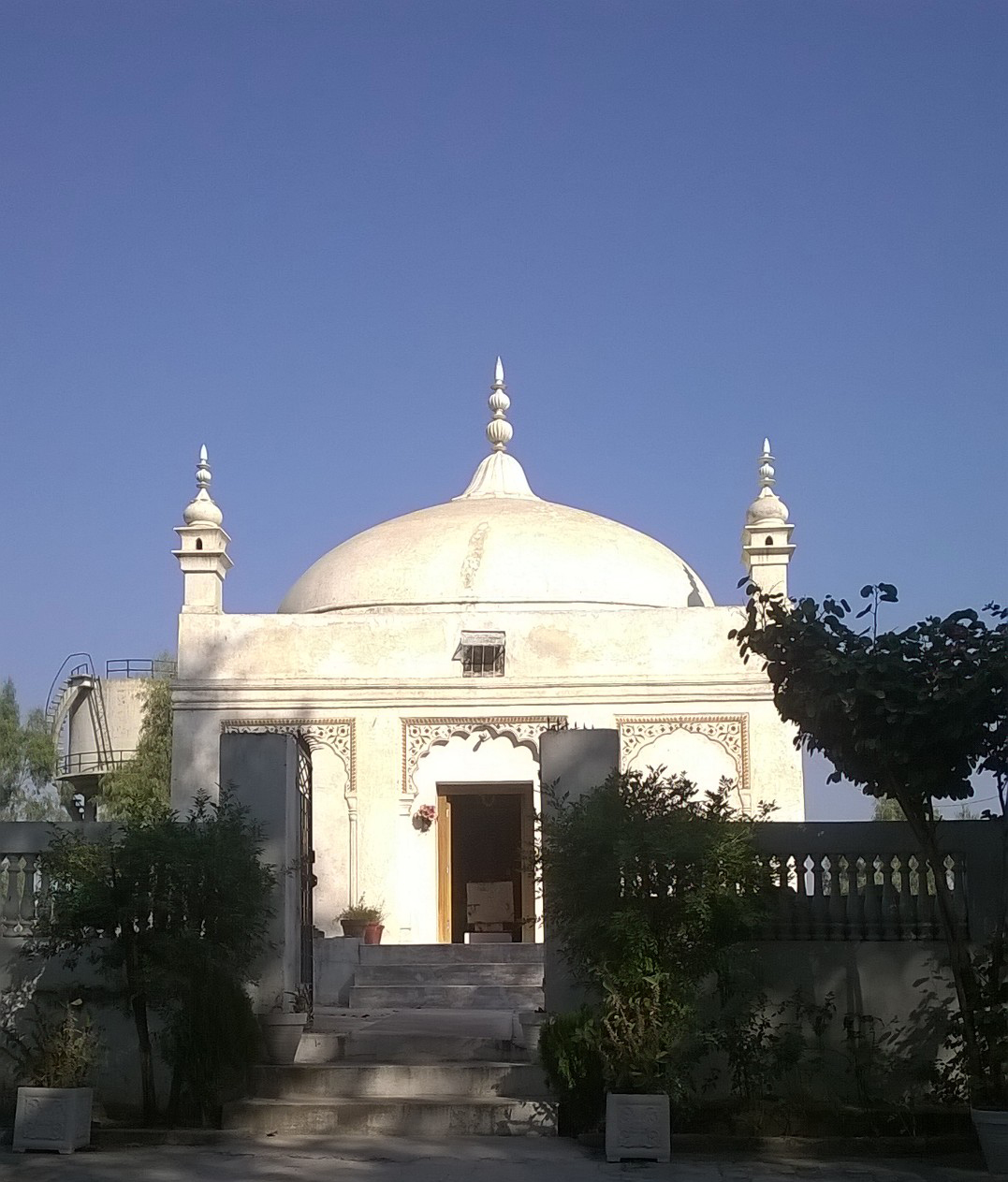
- Shrine of Hafiz Muhammad Hayat

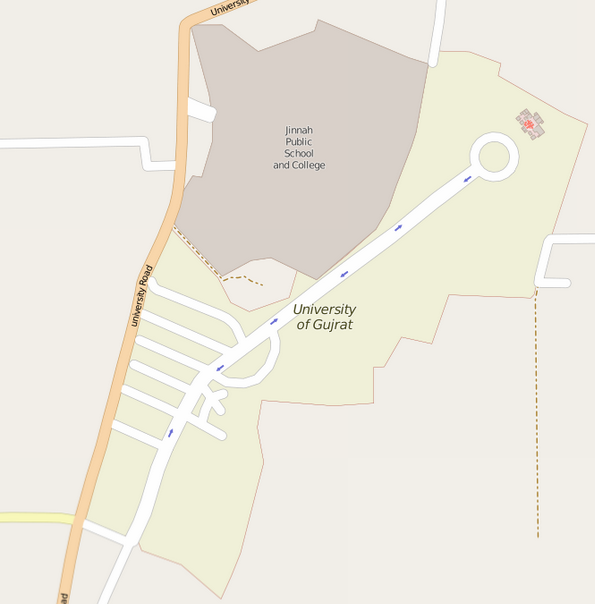
- Map of Hafiz Hayat
- Country: Pakistan
- Province: Punjab
- District: Gujrat
- Time zone: UTC+5 (PST)
- Calling code: 053

Hafiz Hayat (Urdu: حافظ حیات) is a place in district of Gujrat, Pakistan. It is named after a local Sufi saint Hafiz Muhammad Hayat.

== History ==
Hafiz Muhammad Hayat travelled from Delhi to Wazirabad during the Mughal period. Hafiz was a devoted disciple of the renowned mystic Baqi Shah Auliya, who had arrived in Wazirabad during the reign of Ahmad Shah Abdali. Baqi Shah's mysticism, steeped in profound spirituality, was such that a single glance from him could kindle a deep and enduring love in the hearts of his followers. Baqi Shah, in turn, initiated three disciples—Daim Shah, Hafiz Hayat, and the goldsmith Mai Durgo—into the secrets of mysticism. The fort was surrounded by a dense forest and it was later settled by Hafiz Hayat when he aided people with his spiritual aura. He died in 1771, during the reign of Gujjar Singh Bhangi. The main campus of University of Gujrat has been constructed on the land donated by Hafiz Muhammad Hayat and is named after him.

== Shrine of Hafiz Hayat ==
Situated atop a 12-meter-high mound, the complex included a haveli, a baradari, seven wells, four graves of disciples, and a mosque. The place was initially the property of the then ruler Raja Kaladhvi.
