= Kheewa =

Coordinates: 32°37′35″N 74°10′55″E

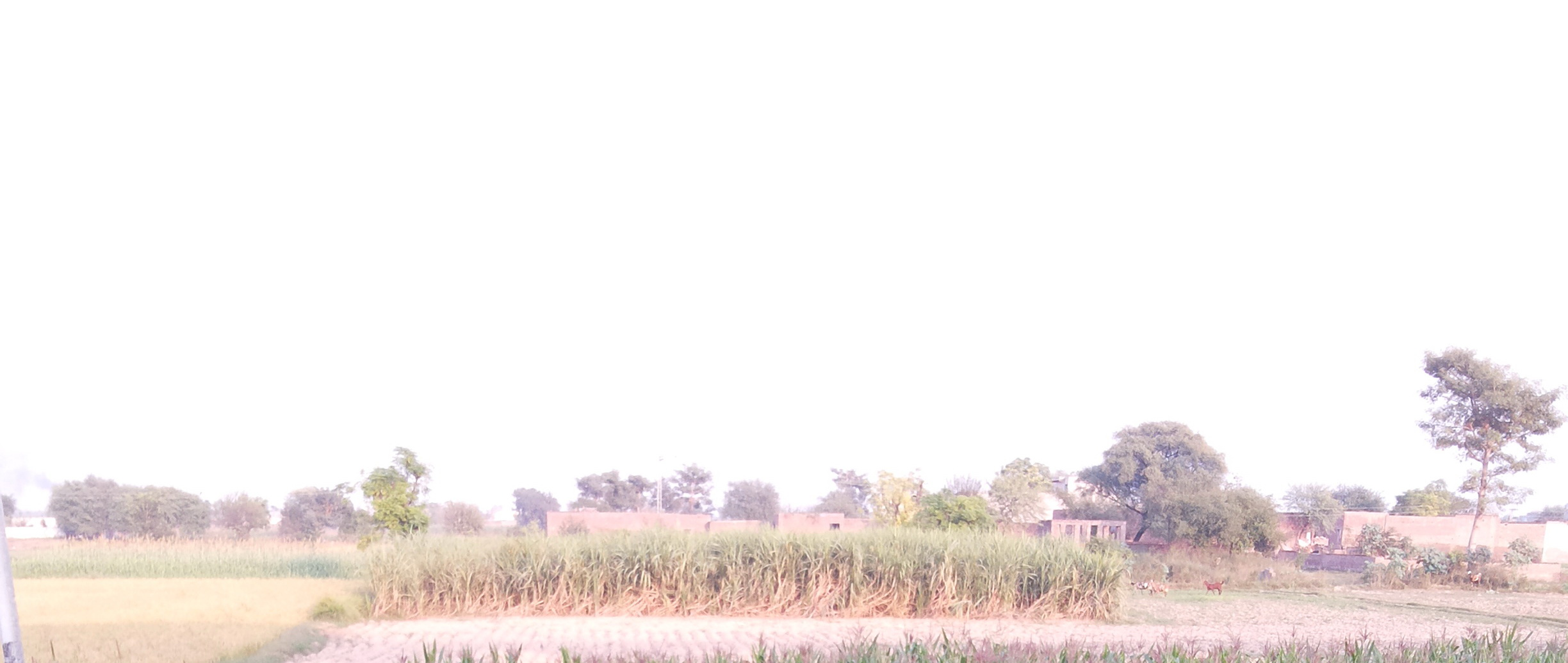

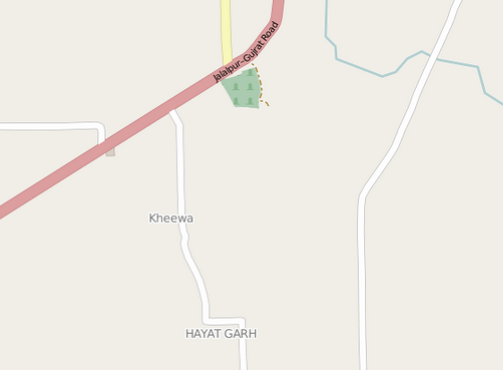
- Location of Kheewa alongside Jalalpur–Gujrat Road
- Country: Pakistan
- Province: Punjab
- District: Gujrat
- Time zone: UTC+5 (PST)
- Calling code: 053

Kheewa (Urdu: کھیوا) is a village situated along the Jalalpur–Gujrat road in Gujrat District, in the Punjab province of Pakistan.

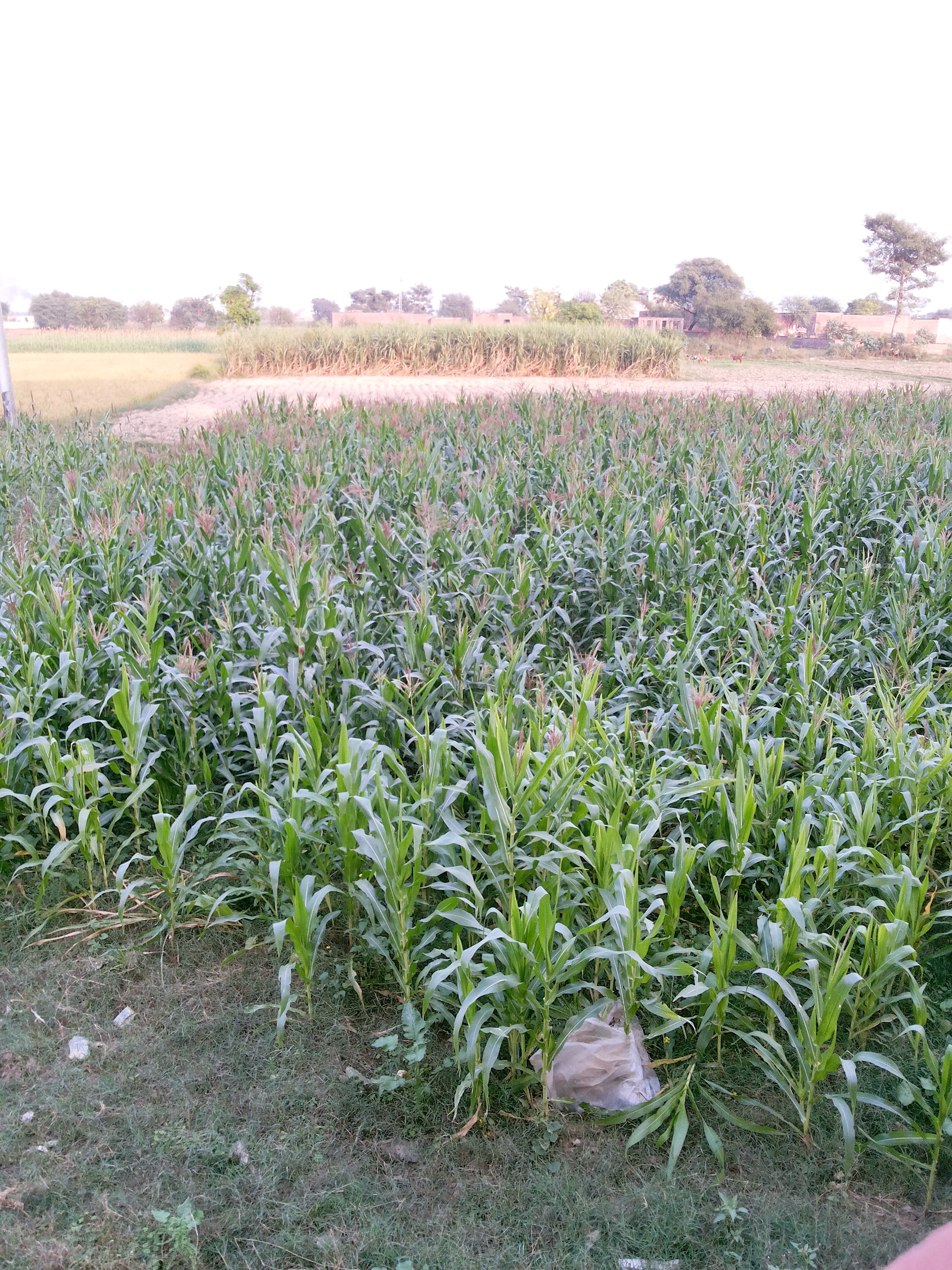
Vegetation at the outskirts of Kheewa
