= Jalalpur Jattan =

Jalalpur Jattan جلالپور جٹاں
- City
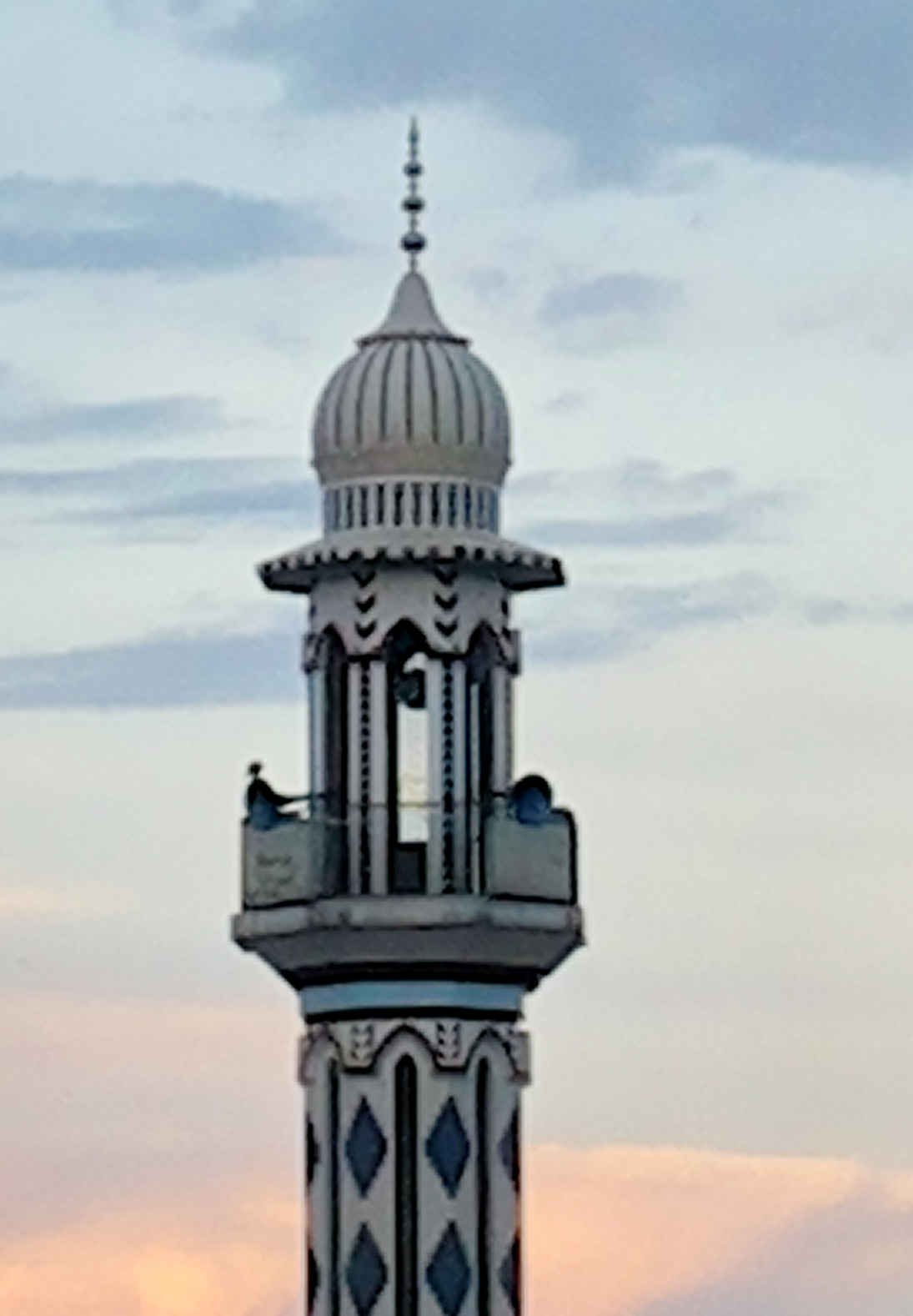
- Saqib Minar is the notable tower of the city

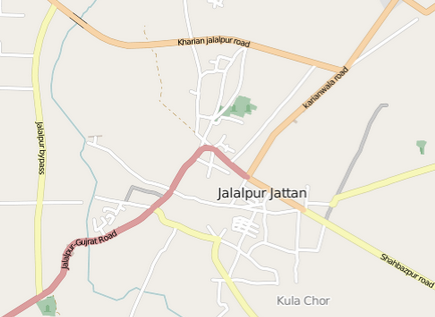
- Map of Jalalpur Jattan

- Location within Punjab, Pakistan Location within Pakistan
- Coordinates: 32°38′31.0″N 74°12′11.9″E
- Country: Pakistan
- Province: Punjab
- District: Gujrat

Government
  - Type: Municipal Committee
  - Chief Officer: Asrar Chattha
  - Municipal Officer (Finance): Ali Hassan

Population (2023 census)
  - City: 146,743
  - Rank: 79th in Pakistan
- Time zone: UTC+5 (PST)
- Calling code: 053
- Motorways: M-12

Jalalpur Jattan (Punjabi: جلالپور جٹاں, Urdu: جلالپور جٹاں) is a city in Gujrat District in the province of Punjab, Pakistan. It is the centre of Jalalpur Jattan Tehsil and about 50 km from Pakistani Kashmir.

== History ==
When Alexander the Great defeated Porus, he established two towns: one near the Jhelum River, and the other near the Chenab River. The latter, the present-day Jalalpur Jattan, was named Shaklanagar, an amalgamation of Greek and Sanskrit words meaning "the city of beauty". These cities were settled by people from Alexander's multinational armies, which included a majority of Greeks. The two cities and their associated realms thrived long after Alexander's departure. Later, when Jalal ud din Firuz Khalji and his forces stayed here to suppress the invasion of Mongols, he renamed the city Jalalabad after himself. The name was once again changed to Jalalpur Jattan by the notable Jats of their time, said to be Zabardast Khan and Ajmer Khan.

During the Sikh Empire, the town gained significant importance. There is a place in Jalalpur Jattan built by Chandragupta Maurya in 300 BC. Local historians believe that Chandragupta had built a fort in Salamgarh, a suburban village of Jalalpur Jattan. The original name of the village could not be ascertained but the fort became famous as Islamgarh Fort with the passage of time. The fort of Islam Garh had remained under Aurangzeb Alamgir, Ahmed Shah Abdali, and Ranjit Singh and their forces. The fort had been the mint of Maharaja Ranjit Singh of Lahore in 1832. Only some deteriorated remains of the fort exist today.

There is also an ancient city within the territories of the city, now a town known as Kulachor. Excavations in the area revealed that Kulachor was the mint of the Maurya Dynasty.

In 1908, Jalalpur Jattan was made a municipality or municipal committee, the fully representative body. The city was granted tehsil status in November but it still in process due to lack of interest. 2016.

== Demographics ==
Population

Historical population
Year	Pop.	±% p.a.
1951	18,138	—
1961	16,988	−0.65%
1972	23,459	+2.98%
1981	29,590	+2.61%
1998	69,395	+5.14%
2017	96,210	+1.73%
2023	146,743	+7.29%

According to 2023 census, Jalalpur Jattan had a population of 146,743.

Languages

Languages of Jalalpur Jattan MC (2023 Census)
1. Punjabi (92.2%)
2. Urdu (4.80%)
3. Pashto (2.30%)
4. Others (0.70%)

== Climate ==
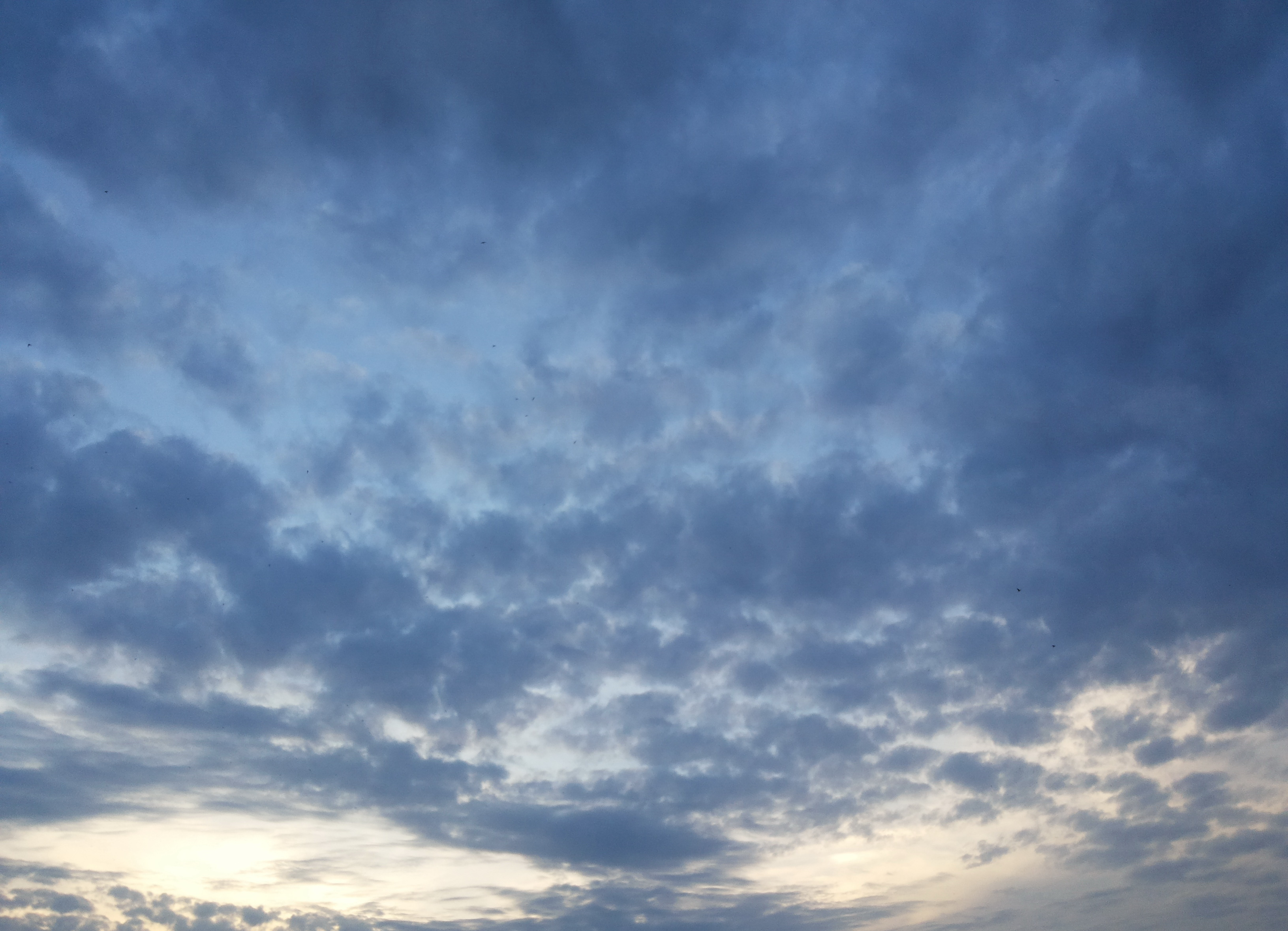
Sky view from the city

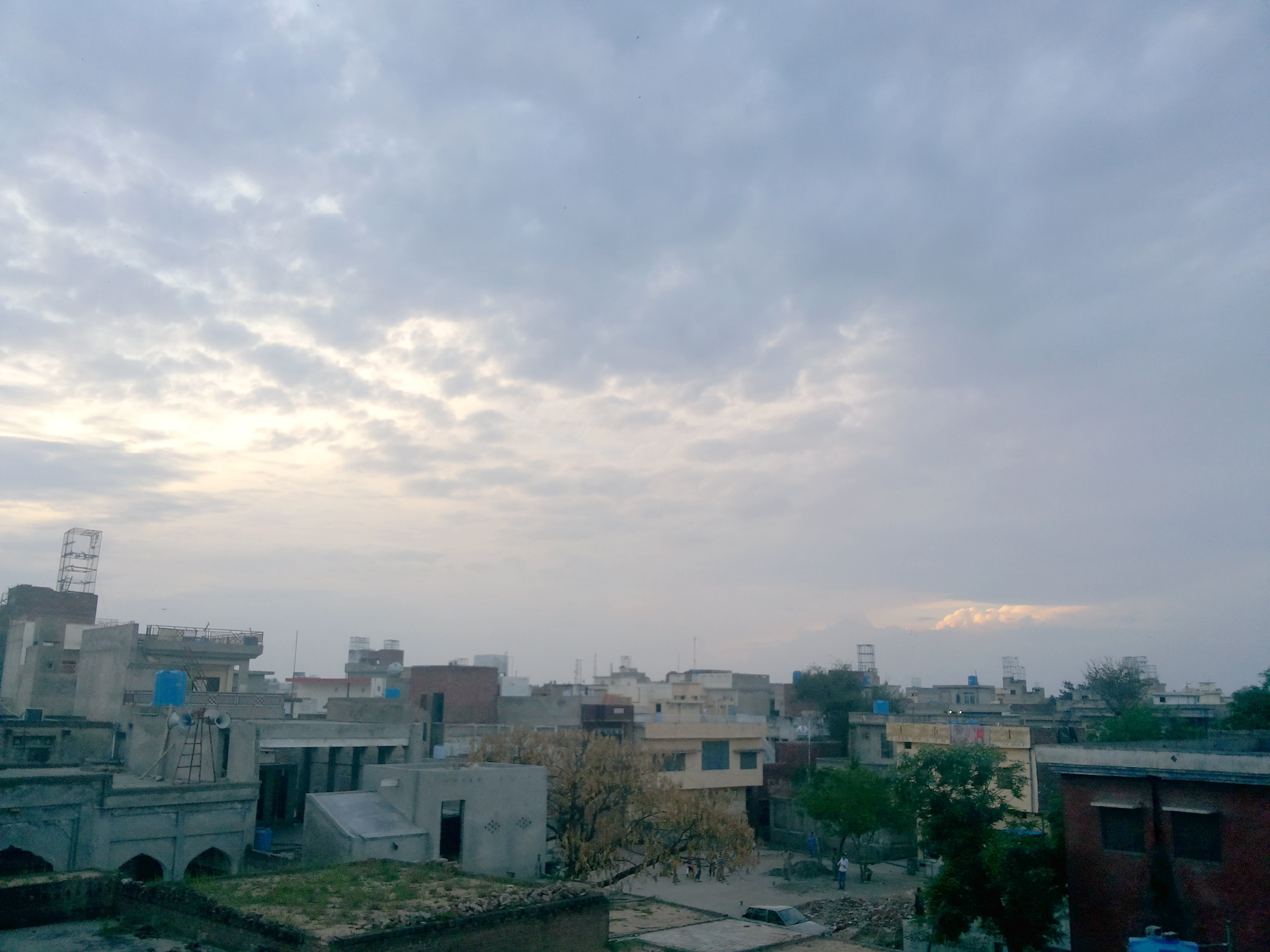
View of Sadhu Neighbourhood

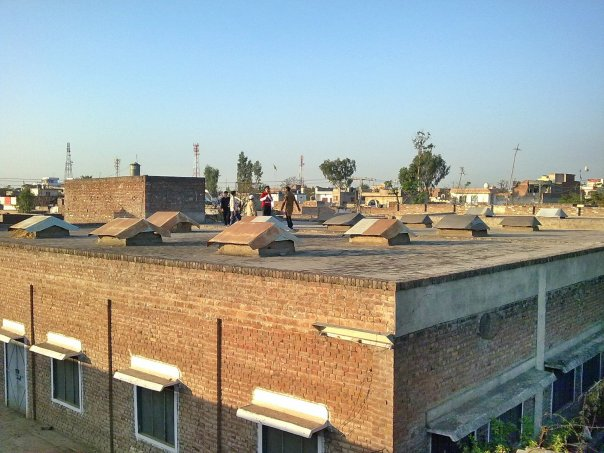
Factory building

The town has moderate climate. The average temperature of the city is 23.9 °C. During the peak of summer, the daytime temperature shoots up to 45 °C, but the hot spells are relatively short due to the proximity of the Azad Kashmir mountains. During the winter, the minimum temperature may fall below 2 °C. The rainfall in the city is remarkable, with precipitation even during the parched months. The average rainfall is 802 mm.

== Economy ==
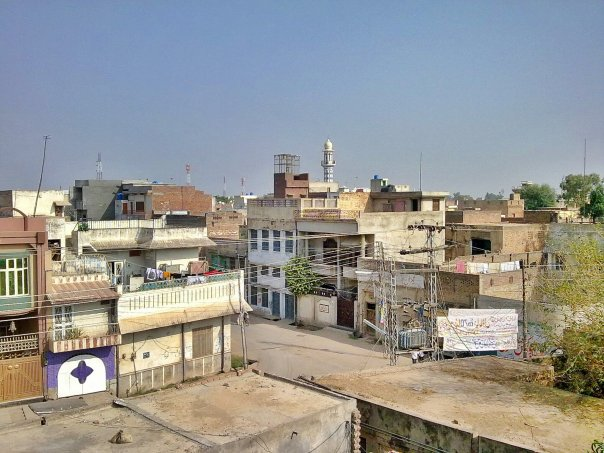
View of Saqib Mosque tower from an intersection of Sadhu Mohalla

The city is famous for its textile cottage industry and its local sweets called Khatai. Jalalpur Jattan connects Gujrat with multiple cities via the Jalalpur–Gujrat Road.

Jalalpur Jattan is head office of the Sadar Circle Gujrat.

== Cantonment ==
Jalapur Jattan has a small cantonment area, which has its importance due to its proximity with the line of control and important strategic cities of Azad Kashmir like Chamb, Kot Jamil and important headworks of river Chenab such as Head Marala.

== Notable people ==
- Ejaz Durrani, Actor - He was married to the famous singer Noor Jehan
- Raj Babbar, Indian actor and politician

== See also ==
- Jalalpur–Gujrat Road
- Jalalpur Jattan Tehsil
- Jalalpur Jattan Tehsil
- Ranewal
