= Kot Ameer Hussain =

Coordinates: 32°39′03″N 74°10′06″E

Kot Ameer Hussain کوٹ امیر حسین
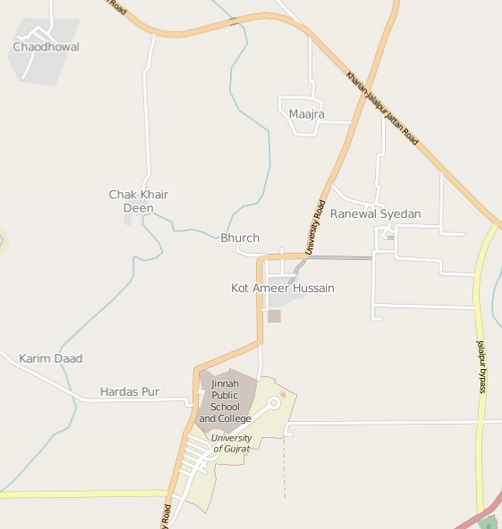
- Location of Kot Ameer Hussain on map
- Country: Pakistan
- Province: Punjab
- District: Gujrat
- Time zone: UTC+5 (PST)
- Calling code: 053

Kot Ameer Hussain (Urdu: کوٹ امیر حسین) is a village situated near University of Gujrat in Gujrat District, of the Punjab province, Pakistan.
