= Sook Khurd =

Coordinates: 32°36′13″N 74°08′55″E

Sook Khurd سوک خورد
- Interactive map of Sook Khurd
- Country: Pakistan
- Province: Punjab
- District: Gujrat
- Time zone: UTC+5 (PST)
- Calling code: 053

Sook Khurd (Urdu: سوک خورد) is a village in Gujrat District, in Punjab, Pakistan. It is located near the Sook Kalan village and about 6 kilometers north of Gujrat city.
