= University of Gujrat =

Public university in Punjab, Pakistan

- جامعہ گجرات
- Motto: A World Class University
- Type: Public university
- Established: 2004; 22 years ago
- Accreditation: Higher Education Commission; Pakistan Engineering Council; Pakistan Council for Architects and Town Planners
- Chancellor: Governor of the Punjab
- Vice-Chancellor: Prof. Dr. Zahoor Ul Haq (T.I)
- Academic staff: 688
- Students: 17814 (73.3% female, 0.17% foreign nationals)
- Location: Gujrat, Punjab, Pakistan; 32°38′29.55″N 74°9′55.58″E
- Campus: HH Campus, 368 acres (149 ha)
- Nickname: UOG
- Mascots: Hayatian, Uogian
- Website: uog.edu.pk

The University of Gujrat (UOG) is a public university located in Gujrat, Punjab, Pakistan. It was established in 2004.

University rankings

Global – Overall
- THE World: 801-1000

National – Overall
- HEC National: 24
- THE National: 10

== History ==
The University of Gujrat (UoG) has its historical roots in a college established in 1949 at the Kaidar Nath Haveli. The college, inaugurated by Fatima Jinnah, was initially a women's college with Begum Surraya Saleem as its first principal. The haveli, erected in 1905 by Lala Kaidar Nath, a notable Hindu magistrate of Gujrat, encompassed an area of four kanals and 19 marlas and featured 25 rooms. Noteworthy for its architectural significance, the building was one of the notable structures in the region. Lala Kaidar Nath, who died in the 1935 Quetta earthquake, was known for his charitable activities. His family migrated to India in 1947.

The college came under the administration of the education department in 1952.

In 2004, the University of Gujrat was officially established on the land donated by Hafiz Muhammad Hayat. This land was initially owned by Rai Bular Bhatti, a Muslim ruler of Talwandi, who donated this land for spiritual and religious purposes in 1575.

In 2005, a restoration project, led by the district government and archaeology department, aimed to preserve the building's original structure. The college underwent a name change by the then education minister, Mian Imran Masood, becoming the Government Fatima Jinnah College for Women. Subsequently, the college building was incorporated into the University of Gujrat.

In 2006, the Punjab government declared the Kaidar Nath Haveli as UoG's first campus. With the university's move to a new campus at Hafiz Hayat village in July 2007, the haveli was designated as the university's old campus.

== Pakistan's highest female literacy ==
University of Gujrat has made significant strides in female literacy with a rate of approximately 73.03% in co-education, showing a progressive outlook towards women's education.

== Pakistan's Longest Transport System ==
UoG Transport System is the one-and-only transport system in Pakistan. Its routes run to all industrial cities and towns in Central Punjab, including Sialkot, Daska, Gujranwala, Gujrat, Kharian, Guliana, Bhagwal, Lala Musa, Dinga, Alipur Chatha, Jhelum, Wazirabad, Mandi Bahauddin, Sarai Alamgir, Sabour, Kotla Arab Ali Khan, and Bhimber.

== Grading System ==
The University of Gujrat (UOG) uses an absolute grading system with a fixed range. The grading table is:

Grading Table
Percentage	Grade	GPA
84.5 and above	A+	4.00
79.5-84	A	3.70
74.5-79	B+	3.40
69.5-74	B	3.00
64.5-69	B-	2.50
59.5-64	C+	2.00
54.5-59	C	1.50
49.5-54	D	1.00
49.4 and below	F	0.00

== Recognized university ==
Department In Hafiz Hayat Campus

University of Gujrat is a recognized university by the Higher Education Commission of Pakistan and Pakistan Engineering Council. Among the 58 recognized Punjab higher-education institutions, it ranks at number 9 among the 'Top Universities in Punjab' in 2021. It ranks at number 24 among all over Pakistan.

== Faculties ==
- Faculty of Arts
- Faculty of Computing & Information Technology
- Faculty of Engineering & Technology
- Faculty of Management & Administrative Sciences
- Faculty of Science
- Faculty of Social Sciences
- School of Art Design & Architecture
- Nawaz Sharif Medical College

== Campuses ==
The University of Gujrat has two campuses across Pakistan:

- University of Gujrat (Hafiz Hayat Main Campus)
- University of Gujrat (Mandi Bahauddin Campus)

== Alumni ==
Alumni of the University of Gujrat are serving in various government and private institutions, as well as in national and international organizations. Several alumni have achieved distinction across multiple professional fields. Notable alumni include:
