= Malka, Gujrat =

Malka ملکہ
- Town and Union Council
- Interactive map of Malka
- Coordinates: 32°51′N 73°59′E
- Country: Pakistan
- Province: Punjab
- Division: Gujrat
- District: Gujrat
- Tehsil: Kharian
- Thana: Guliana
- Time zone: UTC+5 (PST)
- Postal code: 50170
- Area code: +9253

Malka is a town and union council of Gujrat District, in the Punjab province of Pakistan. It is part of Kharian Tehsil and is located at 32°51'0N 73°59'0E with an altitude of 285 metres (938 feet). Malka village is 8 km from Guliana on the main Manglia Road. This road goes to Manglia, Thuta Rai Bahadur, and passing along different villages connects to Azad Kashmir.

99% of people belong to Awan-Malik Tribe.

== Population ==
The population of Malka town is nearly 7,200. There are approximately 3,000 registered votes here.

== Neighbourhoods ==
Nearby settlement are Manglia, Thutha Rai Bahadar, Chak Budho, Jhantla, Kotla Haji Shah, Golra Hashim, Chak Bakhtawar, Bhagwal, and Jand Sharif.

== Education ==
Boy and Girls. High and primary Schools from Govt of Pakistan Established in 1963. Literacy rate in Malka is 95% in 2018 survey. There are many more highly educated men/women from Malka, who served and also serving in high posts of Army, government and private organisations.

== Mosques ==
9 Mosques and 3 Islamic Madaras located in Malka. The oldest Mosque is Jamia Masjid Malka, located in center of village. its more than 250 years old.

- 1 Jamia Masjid
- 2 Madni Masjid
- 3 Bilal Masjid
- 4 Gulshana toheed Masjid
- 5 Maki Masjid
- 6 Haq 4 Yar Masjid
- 7 Shaheen Marquee Masjid
- 8 Hospital Masjid
- 9 Masjid Khilafat e Rashida

== Commerce ==
Malka Shopping Market (Bazar) is an emerging marketplace that has been serving the surrounding villages for the last 10 years. You can find multiple types of shops around the marketplace.

Awan Market: Different types of shops situated in market both sides of main road.

Also Amjid Market, Bismillah Market, Usmania Market, and Nawab Plaza.

== Hospitals ==
A Rural Health Centre with 24 Hours Emergency Patient Department is working for the patients of Malka and surrounding villages since 1980.
