= M-13 motorway (Pakistan) =

Road in Pakistan

M-13 motorway
- ایم ١٣ موٹروے
- Kharian-Rawalpindi Motorway

Route information
- Maintained by National Highway Authority
- Length: 117 km (73 mi)
- Existed: 2024–present
- History: Under Construction completed by 2026

Major junctions
- East end: Kharian
- West end: via Rawalpindi bypass: Rawalpindi; Rawalpindi Ring Road

Location
- Country: Pakistan
- Major cities: Rawalpindi; Rawat; Mandra; Gujar Khan; Sohawa; Dina; Jhelum; Sarai Alamgir; Kharian
- Towns: Bhagwal; Golra Hashim; Malka
- Villages: Sagri; Nakodar

Highway system
- Roads in Pakistan
← M-12	→ M-14

The M-13 Motorway (Urdu: موٹروے 13), or the Khariani–Rawalpindi Motorway, is a motorway in Pakistan, under construction since September 2022. M-13 will connect Rawalpindi to Kharian. The 117 km (73 mi) long motorway will have 8 interchanges, 2 service areas, 26 bridges, including one spanning River Jhelum, and two twin-tube tunnels of 1.3 km (0.81 mi) and 0.6 km (0.37 mi) respectively to cross the Salt Range between Dina and Sohawa. The M-13 will be a six-lane motorway with a design speed of 120 km/h (75 mph) and an expected completion time of 2 years. The motorway will reduce the travel time between the capital cities of Islamabad and Lahore by one hour compared to the existing M2 Motorway, while also taking traffic off of the congested N5 Highway that runs parallel to it. It is link to M2 Motorway via Rawalpindi Ring Road.
