= Jathekey =

Jathekey جیٹھیکے
- Village
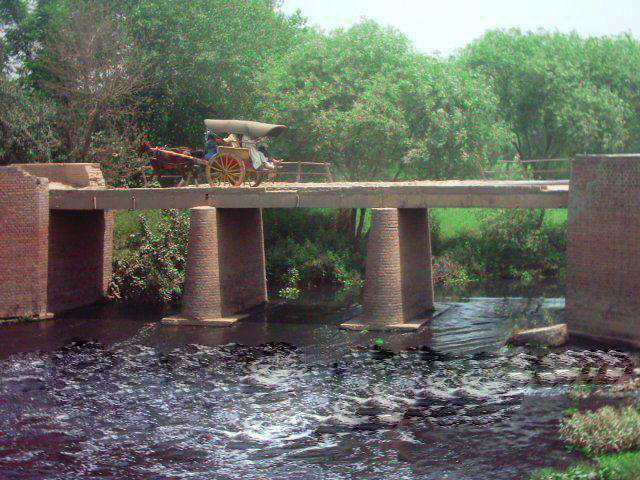

- Location within Pakistan
- Coordinates: 32.16°N 74.40°E
- Country: Pakistan
- Province: Punjab
- District: Sialkot
- Tehsil: Sambrial
- Elevation: 238 m (781 ft)
- Time zone: UTC+5 (PST)

Jathekey (Urdu: جیٹھیکے) is a village of Sialkot District in the Punjab province of Pakistan. It is located 2 km north-west of Sambrial. Jathekey is one of the biggest villages of Sialkot among 161 villages.

== Location ==
Jathekey is located in North-West of Sambrial and lies 2 km away from north end of Sialkot Lahore Motorway, 4 km away from Sialkot Dry Port and 8 km away from Sialkot International Airport. It is located at 32.16°N 74.40°E.The nearest railway station is 3 km away (Sambrial railway station). Export Processing Zone Is Situated in South Of Village and Famous Stream Nala Palkhu Flows in North of village.

== Sectors/Mohalla ==
- Jathekey East
- Jathekey West
- Palkhu
- Nangrawala
- Haiderpura

== Climate ==
Jathekey is cold during winters and hot and humid during summers. May and June are the hottest months. The temperature during winter may drop to 0 °C. The land is, generally, plain and fertile. Most of the rain falls during the Monsoon season in summer which often results in flooding.

Climate data for Jathekey
Month	Jan	Feb	Mar	Apr	May	Jun	Jul	Aug	Sep	Oct	Nov	Dec	Year
Mean daily maximum °C (°F)	18 (64)	21 (69)	26 (78)	33 (91)	39 (102)	40 (104)	35 (95)	33 (91)	34 (93)	32 (89)	26 (78)	20 (68)	29 (84)
Mean daily minimum °C (°F)	5 (41)	8 (46)	12 (53)	18 (64)	23 (73)	26 (78)	26 (78)	25 (77)	23 (73)	17 (62)	10 (50)	5 (41)	16 (60)
Average precipitation cm (inches)	4.1 (1.6)	4 (1.6)	4.4 (1.7)	2.1 (0.8)	1.7 (0.7)	6.8 (2.7)	27.1 (10.7)	25.6 (10.1)	13.2 (5.2)	1.4 (0.6)	1.1 (0.4)	2.1 (0.8)	93.6 (36.8)

== Union Council Jathekey ==
Jathekey is capital of UC Jathekey. Total number of registered voters in union council is 11,000. Union council consists of following villages:

- Jathekey
- Haddokey
- Kalokey
- Majra Kalaan

== Education ==
Jathekey has a very good literacy rate. It has 1 Government high school for boys and 2 Government primary school for girls, it also has a college and number of private schools and tuition academies. Mostly people preferred to study in Sambrial or Sialkot.

== Administration ==
National Assembly	NA-112 (Sialkot-III)
Provincial Assembly	PP-131
Union Council	UC-Jathekey
