= Motorways of Pakistan =

- Pakistan motorway sign

System information
- Maintained by National Highway Authority
- Length: 2,864 km (1,780 mi)
- Formed: 1997

Highway names

System links
- Roads in Pakistan

Motorways of Pakistan (Urdu: پاکستان کے موٹروے) are a network of multiple-lane, high-speed, controlled-access highways in Pakistan which are owned, maintained, and operated federally by Pakistan's National Highway Authority. Motorways are a part of Pakistan's "National Trade Corridor Project" and "China-Pakistan Belt Road Initiative," from Khunjerab Pass near the Chinese border to Gwadar in Balochistan and Karachi in Sindh. There are a total of 16 motorways, 10 of which are fully operational, while some are under construction and others are planned. At present, 2,864 kilometres (1,780 mi) of motorways are operational, while an additional 946 kilometres (588 mi) are under construction.

All motorways in Pakistan are prefixed with the letter 'M' (for "Motorway") followed by the unique numerical designation of the specific highway (with a hyphen in the middle), e.g. "M-1".

== History ==
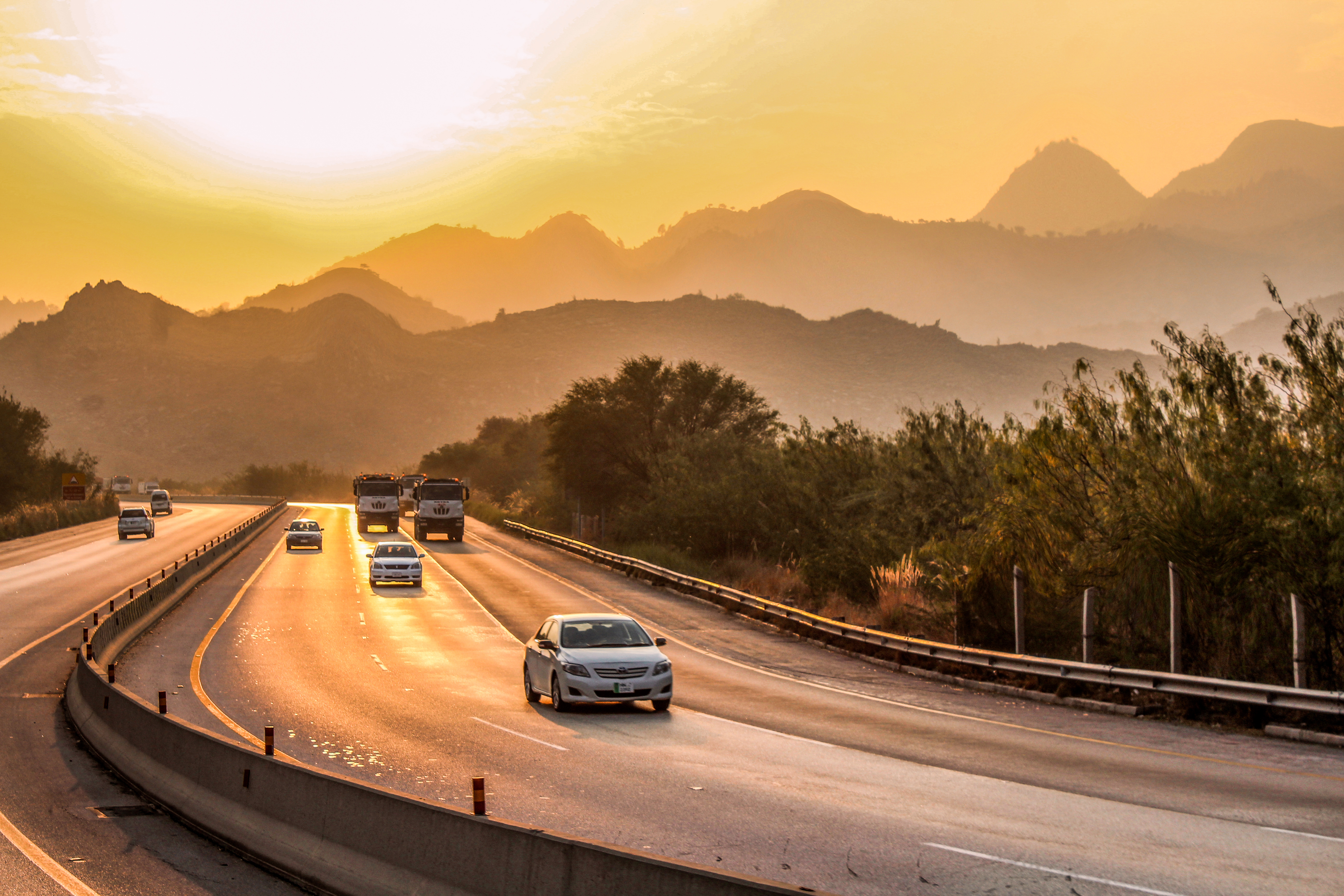
M-2 motorway in the Salt Range

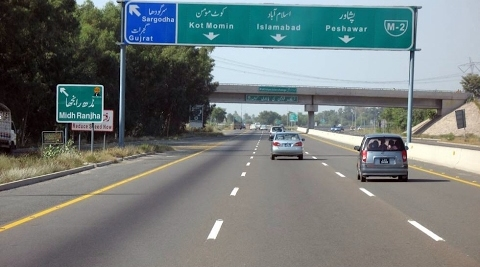
M-2 motorway exit to Sargodha

Pakistan's motorway network is a key component of the "National Trade Corridor Project" (NTCP), which aims to connect Pakistan's three Arabian Sea ports Port of Karachi, Port Qasim, and Gwadar Port with the rest of the country through an integrated network of motorways, national highways, and expressways. The corridor also strengthens regional connectivity with Afghanistan, Central Asia and China. In addition, the China Pakistan Economic Corridor (CPEC) utilizes Pakistan's highways, motorways and expressways network to connect Gwadar Port with Kashgar, China enhancing regional trade and economic integration.

The development of Pakistan's motorway system began in the early 1990s with the objective of improving road safety, reducing travel time, and promoting economic growth. The foundation of the motorway network was laid on 30 December 1991, when the contract for the M-2 (Lahore–Islamabad) motorway was awarded to the South Korean company Daewoo. The M-2 Motorway was inaugurated on 26 November 1997, becoming Pakistan's first motorway and the first modern motorway in South Asia. Its success led to the expansion of the national motorway network with the M-4 (Pindi Bhattian–Faisalabad) section in 2003, M-1 (Islamabad–Peshawar) in 2007, M-9 (Karachi–Hyderabad) in 2018, M-3 (Lahore–Abdul Hakeem), M-4 (Faisalabad–Multan) section, and M-5 (Multan–Sukkur) in 2019, M-11 (Lahore–Sialkot) and M-15 (Hazara Motorway) in 2020, and M-14 (Islamabad–Dera Ismail Khan) together with the completion of M-8 (Ratodero–Gwadar) in 2022. These motorways have significantly improved national connectivity, facilitated trade and tourism, and contributed to Pakistan's economic development. The motorway network continues to expand under the supervision of the National Highway Authority (NHA).

== List of Motorways ==
=== Main Motorways ===
Sign	Name	Route	Length (km)	Lanes	Completion Year	Status	Remarks
M-1	M-1 Motorway	Peshawar–Islamabad	155	6	2007	Operational	--
M-2	M-2 Motorway	Islamabad–Lahore	375	6	1997	Operational	--
M-3	M-3 Motorway	Lahore–AbdulHakeem	230	6	2019	Operational	--
M-4	M-4 Motorway	Pindi Bhattian–Multan	309	4-6	2019	Operational	The route between Pindi Bhattian and Faisalabad is planned to be upgraded from 4 to 6 lanes.
M-5	M-5 Motorway	Multan–Sukkur	392	6	2019	Operational	--
M-6	M-6 Motorway	Sukkur–Hyderabad	306	6	2029 (Expected)	Under Construction	--
M-7	M-7 Motorway	Dadu–Hub	270	--	--	Planned	--
M-8	M-8 Motorway	Ratodero–Gwadar	892	2	In Sections: 2016; 2018; 2022	Partially Operational	The Hoshab – Khuzdar section is currently under construction.
M-9	M-9 Motorway	Hyderabad–Karachi	136	6	2018	Operational	--
M-10	M-10 Motorway	Karachi Northern Bypass	57	2	2007	Operational	The 168 km route is planned to be upgraded from 2 to 6 lanes, with completion expected by 2029.
M-11	M-11 Motorway	Lahore–Sialkot	89	4	2020	Operational	The route is planned to be upgraded from 4 to 6 lanes.
M-12	M-12 Motorway	Sialkot–Kharian	69	6	2029 (Expected)	Under Construction	--
M-13	M-13 Motorway	Kharian–Rawalpindi	117	6	2029 (Expected)	Under Construction	--
M-14	M-14 Motorway	Islamabad–D.I Khan	285	4	2022	Operational	--
M-15	M-15 Motorway	Hasan Abdal–Thakot	180	2-4-6	2020	Operational	Also known as Hazara Motorway.
M-16	M-16 Motorway	Swabi–Fatehpur	160	4	2019 Phase I 2028 Phase II (Expected)	Phase I Operational	Also known as Swat Motorway. Phase II: The Chakdara – Fatehpur section (80 km) is currently under construction.

=== Auxiliary Route Motorways ===
Sign	Name	Route	Length (km)	Lanes	Completion Year	Status	Remarks
--	Gujranwala Expressway	Gujranwala-Wahndo	15.2	4	2024	Operational	Auxiliary route of M-11 Motorway

=== Proposed Motorways (Unofficial) ===
Sign	Name	Route	Length (km)	Lanes	Completion Year	Status	Remarks
--	M-17 Motorway	Lahore–Sahiwal–Bahawalnagar	295	6	--	Planned	Approved by ECNEC on Aug 2023. Cost Revised on Mar 2025.
--	M-18 Motorway	Peshawar–D.I. Khan	360	4	--	Planned	Approved by ECNEC on 10 Sep 2021.
--	M-19 Motorway	Chakdara–Rabat	30	4	--	Planned	Also known as Dir Motorway. Approved by ECNEC on 10 Sep 2021.
--	Mansehra-Chilas	Mansehra-Chilas	172	4	--	Planned	
--	Mansehra–Muzaffarabad–Mirpur Motorway (MMM-Motorway)	Mansehra–Muzaffarabad–Mirpur	200	4	--	Planned	--
--	Peshawar–Kabul–Dushanbe motorway	Peshawar–Kabul–Dushanbe	265	6	--	Planned	--

== Map of Motorways ==
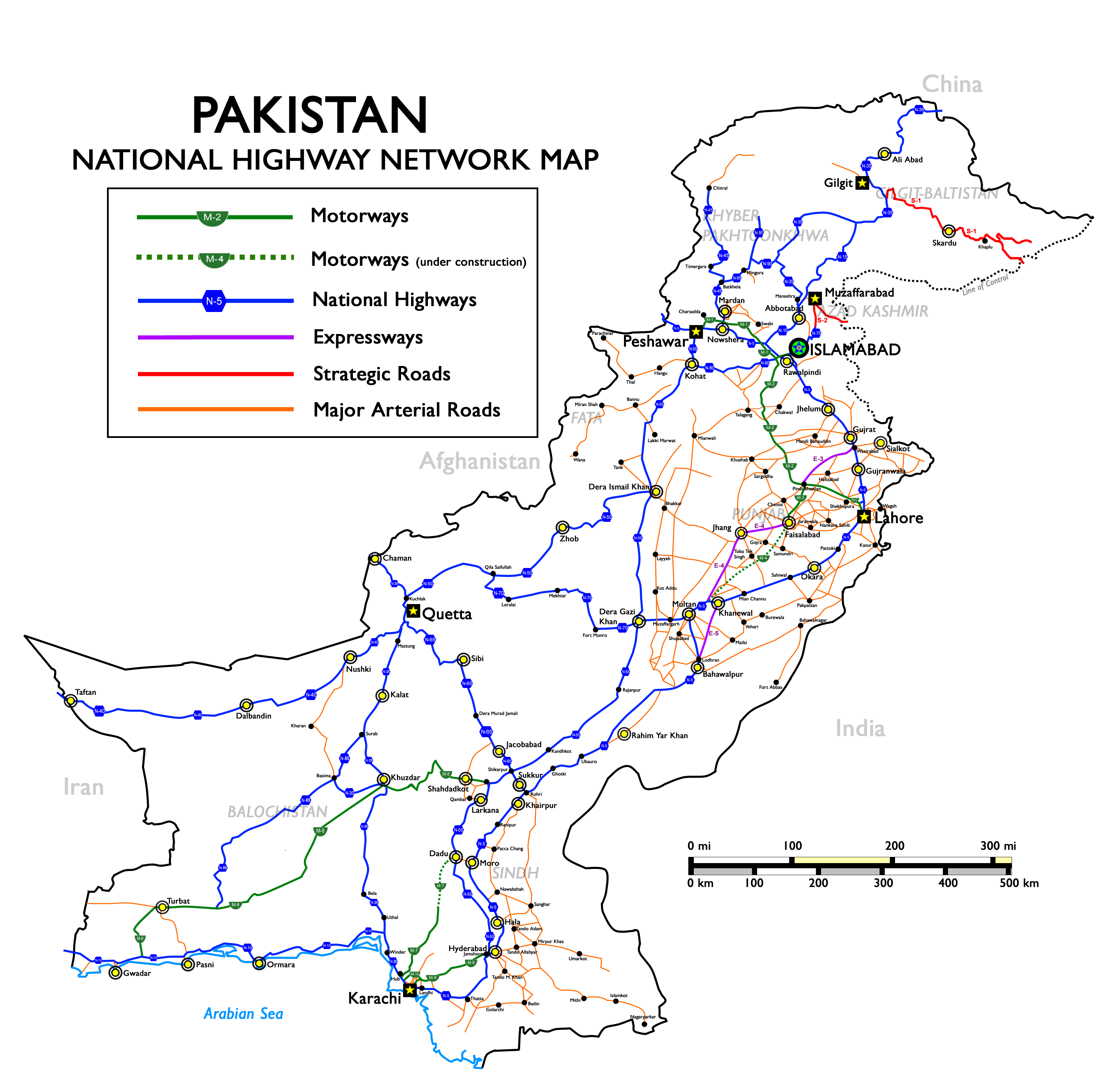
Map of road systems in Pakistan

== Patrolling and Law Enforcement ==
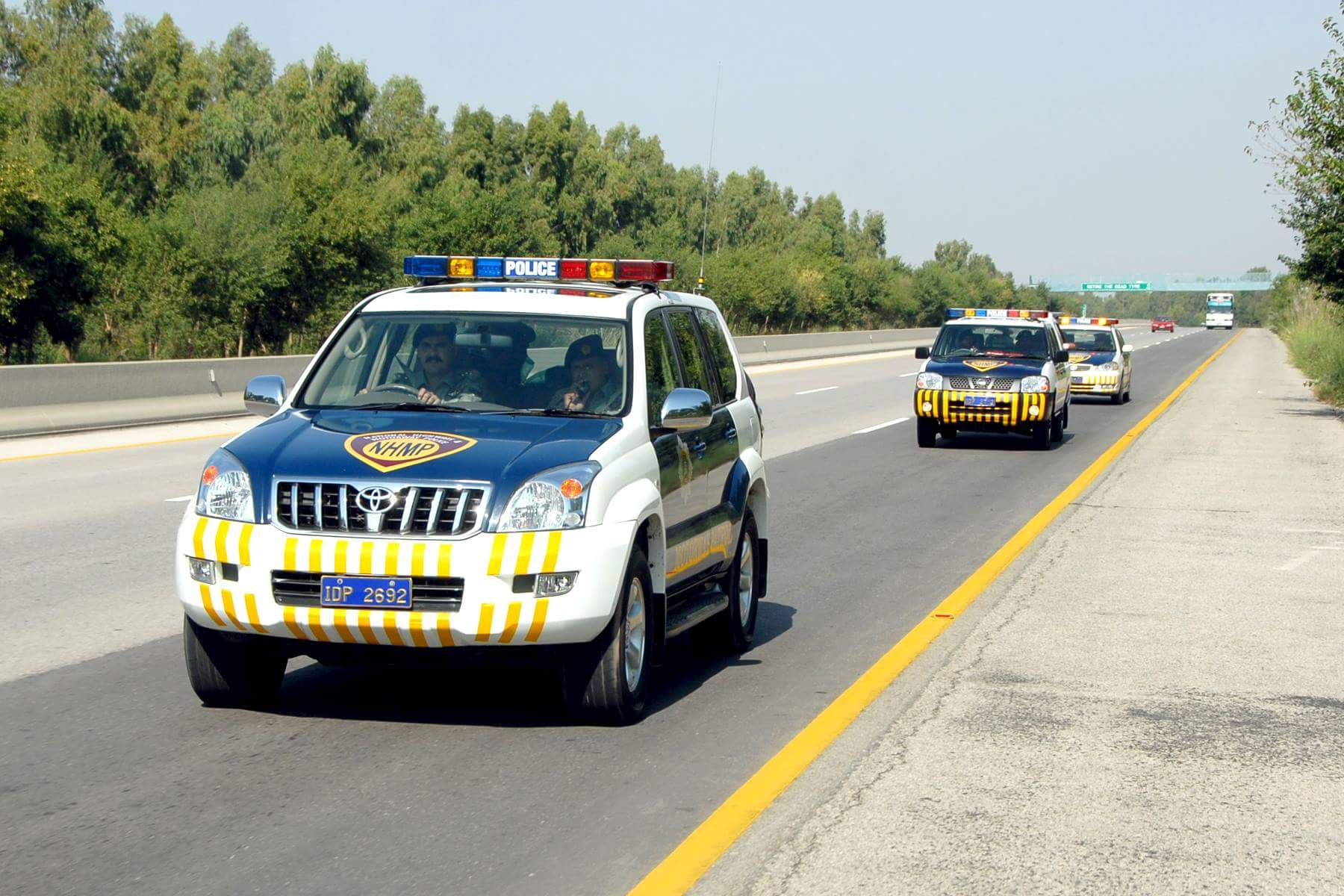
Motorway police patrolling the M-2 motorway

Pakistan's Motorways are patrolled by Pakistan's National Highways & Motorway Police (NH&MP), which is responsible for enforcing traffic and safety laws, maintaining security and providing assistance to motorists across the motorway network. The NH&MP uses SUVs, patrol cars and heavy motorcycles for motorway patrols, while speed cameras are employed to enforce speed limits. The NH&MP operates a 24-hour nationwide helpline, 130, which can be accessed from both mobile phones and landline telephones.

== Speed Limits ==
Pakistan's motorway system is governed by strict traffic laws to ensure road safety. The maximum speed limit is generally 120 km/h for cars and light vehicles and 110 km/h for buses and heavy vehicles, unless otherwise indicated by road signs. Drivers must wear seat belts, follow lane discipline, avoid using mobile phones while driving, and obey all traffic signs and signals. Speeding, reckless driving, and other traffic violations can result in fines, penalty points, or legal action by the NH&MP. Following these rules helps reduce accidents and ensures safe and efficient travel on Pakistan's motorways.

== M-TAG ==
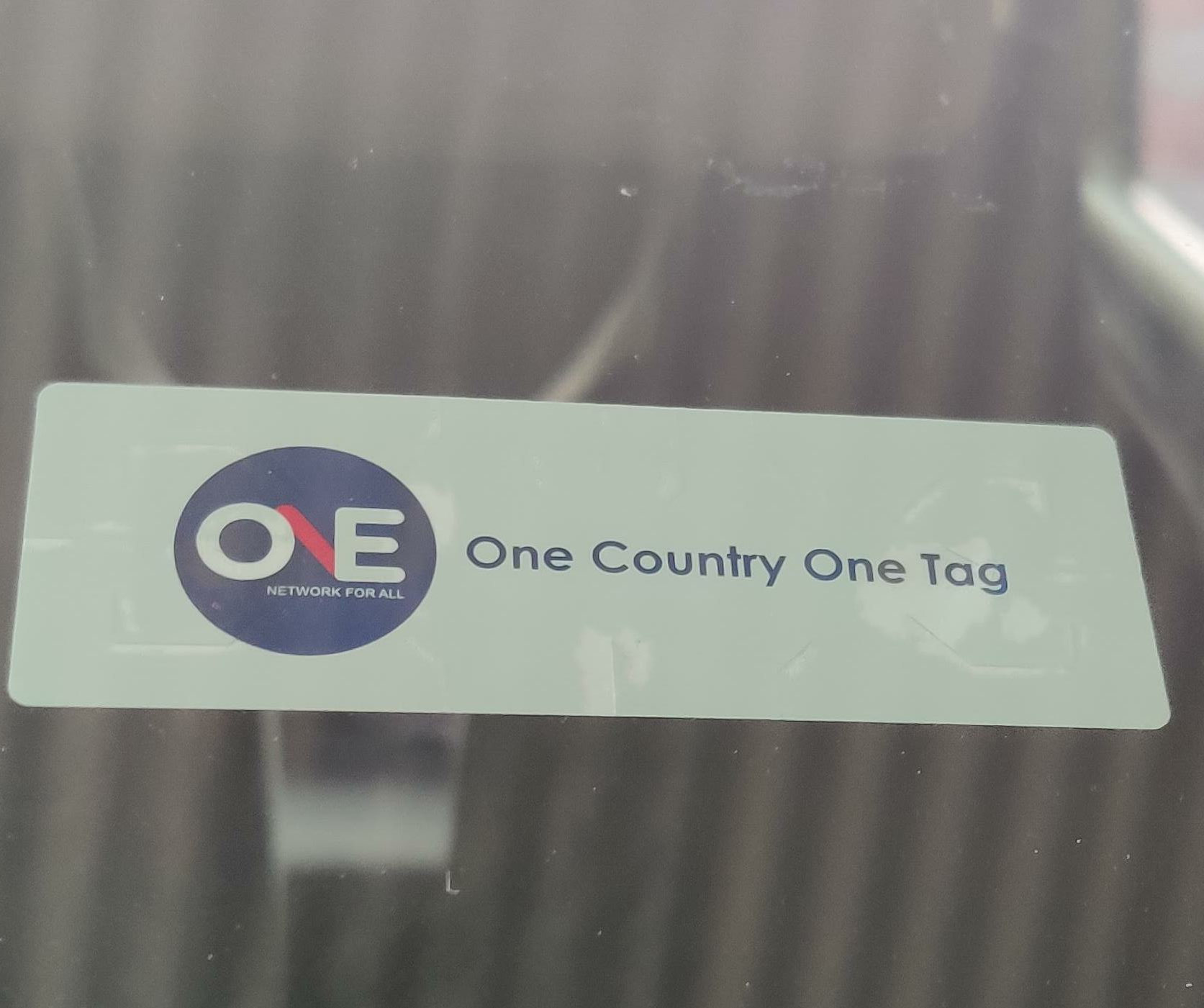
A RFID MTAG used for electronic toll collection on controlled-access highways/motorways/expressways within Pakistan.

In 2016, NHA implemented electronic toll collection on M2 motorway in partnership with One Network that uses a RFID-based tag called the "M-TAG". The tag is attached to the windscreen of vehicles and is automatically scanned at toll plazas on entry and exit, meanwhile debiting the calculated toll tax from a prepaid M-TAG account. The service has since been expanded to all motorways, except M-8, and is also used on Lahore Ring Road.There are M-Tag refilling stations on each toll plaza which is equipped with M-TAG in which you can create and put money in your account. In 2025, the federal government, enforced a new policy regarding entering into ICT-Islamabad (Islamabad Capital territory) will only be allowed to vehicles having an M-tag, which was enforced in February 2026.

== Emergency Runways ==
The M-1 motorway (Peshawar–Islamabad) and the M-2 motorway (Islamabad–Lahore) each feature two 2,700-metre (9,000 ft) emergency runway sections. These four specially designed sections can be made operational by removing the detachable concrete median barriers with forklifts, allowing military aircraft to use the motorways as an emergency airstrip during wartime or military exercises.

2000 – Motorway Landing Exercise

In 2000, the Pakistan Air Force conducted its first publicly known motorway runway exercise on the M-2 motorway. The exercise demonstrated the ability of fighter, trainer, and transport aircraft to operate from a motorway instead of a conventional airbase. Aircraft involved included F-7P fighter aircraft, Super Mushak trainer aircraft and, C-130 transport aircraft. The successful operation validated Pakistan's ability to disperse aircraft during conflict and maintain air operations even if conventional airbases became unavailable.

2002 – Motorway Operational Demonstration

In November 2002, the Pakistan Air Force again used the M-2 motorway for operational landing and take-off exercises. The exercise reaffirmed the effectiveness of motorway runways as alternate operating bases and demonstrated rapid deployment and recovery capabilities. Participating aircraft included F-7P and Mirage III fighter aircraft. Following the exercise, the Pakistan Air Force indicated that motorway runway operations would remain part of its periodic operational training.

2010 – High Mark Exercise

On 2 April 2010, during the large-scale High Mark 2010 air exercise, the Pakistan Air Force once again activated an emergency runway section on the M-2 motorway. The exercise demonstrated the ability to land, refuel, rearm, and launch combat aircraft from a motorway under simulated wartime conditions. Participating aircraft included F-7P and Mirage III. This exercise highlighted the Pakistan Air Force's ability to sustain combat operations from dispersed locations while reducing dependence on permanent airbases.

2019 – Operational Readiness Exercise

In March 2019, the Pakistan Air Force conducted another motorway runway exercise as part of its operational readiness program. Fighter aircraft successfully performed take-offs and landings on a designated motorway section, demonstrating the service's continued emphasis on dispersed air operations and survivability during high-intensity conflict. Participating aircraft included JF-17 Thunder and Mirage 5 fighter aircraft, Super Mushak trainer aircraft, and C-130 transport aircraft. The exercise reaffirmed the PAF's ability to conduct sustained air operations from dispersed locations using motorway runways.

== See also ==
- National Highways of Pakistan
- Expressways of Pakistan
- Transport in Pakistan
- Speed limits in Pakistan
- Belt and Road Initiative
- National Highway Authority
