= Budho Chak =

Village in Punjab, Pakistan

Budho Chak بدھو چک
- Location within Pakistan
- Coordinates: 32°51′09″N 73°58′19″E
- Country: Pakistan
- Province: Punjab
- Division: Gujrat
- District: Gujrat
- Tehsil: Kharian
- Union council: Malka

Budho Chak is a village in Malka Union Council, Kharian Tehsil, Gujrat District, Punjab, Pakistan. The village population is approximately 3,000 inhabitants. 99% of the villagers belong to the Chib-Rajput tribe.

== Geography ==
Budho Chak located at latitude 32.8526″N and longitude 73.9720″E, with altitude of 289 meters, Budho Chak is accessible via the network of roads. Its nearby towns and villages are Malka, Manglia, Malagar, Senthal, Kulak, Jhantla, Kotla Haji Shah, and Golra Hashim.
