= Ikhlasgarh =

Coordinates: 32°37′48″N 74°09′52″E

Ikhlasgarh اخلاص گڑھ
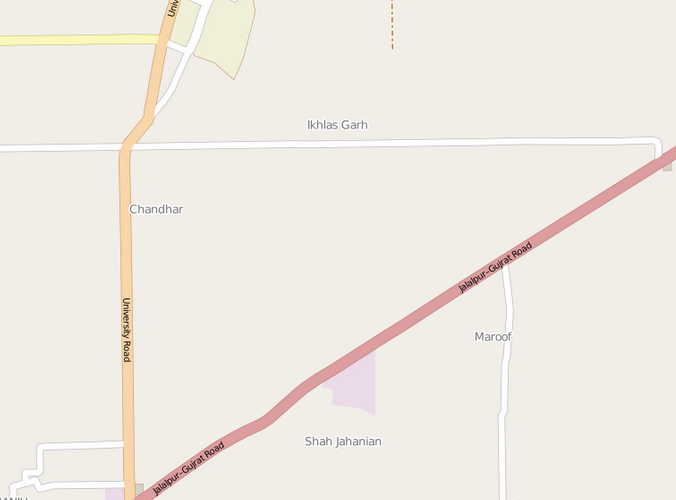
- Location of Ikhlas Garh on map
- Country: Pakistan
- Province: Punjab
- District: Gujrat
- Time zone: UTC+5 (PST)
- Calling code: 053

Ikhlasgarh or Ikhlas Garh (Urdu: اخلاص گڑھ) is a village in Gujrat District of Punjab, Pakistan. Majority of people living in Ikhlas Garh belongs to Bhatti (Jatt) caste while other subgroups include Cheema, Warriach, etc. Most people are self-employed, engaging in growing crops and raising cattle. There are a number of prominent people who migrated to other cities within Pakistan and internationally and working as entrepreneurs, doctors, lawyers, journalist and other important occupations. The village is situated about 12 kilometres (7.5 mi) northeast of Gujrat. The nearest town, Jalalpur Jattan, is 5km away.

The distance between Ikhlas Garh and Sialkot International Airport is 32 km. Shahbazpur bridge on the river Chenab provides easy access to the airport. Travelling to Lahore has become very convenient since the inauguration of the M-11 (Sialkot-Lahore) motorway. It take an hour from Ikhlasgarh to reach the starting point of this motorway.

District Gujrat provides access to many basic amenities such as Government Hospitals, offices, courts and respective departments. Gujrat provides access to other cities via Railway station and G.T Road.

University of Gujrat is located at the border of Ikhlas Garh graveyard and agriculture land. University of Gujrat Hafiz Hayat Campus provides quality education to students who want to excel in professional life. Ikhlas Garh is a prominent tourist destination due to its attractive location, farms, village life, hospitable people that welcome tourist and visitors happily.

It is situated about 12 kilometres (7.5 mi) north east of Gujrat.
