= Randheer =

Randeer Morr رندھیر
- Village 32°31′N 74°14′E
- Randeer Morr
- Location within Pakistan
- Country: Pakistan
- Province: Punjab

Area
  - Total: 10 km^{2} (3.9 sq mi)
- Elevation: 220 m (720 ft)
- Time zone: UTC+5 (PST)
- Calling code: 053

Randeer Morr, also known as Mandi Akbar Abad, is a village in Sialkot District, in central Punjab, Pakistan. It is located at an altitude of 220 metres. The village is 35 kilometers from Gujrat and 20 kilometers from Sialkot. The M11 (Lahore-Sialkot) motorway is 10km from the village.
