= Golra Hashim =

Golra Hashim گولڑہ ہاشم
- Village
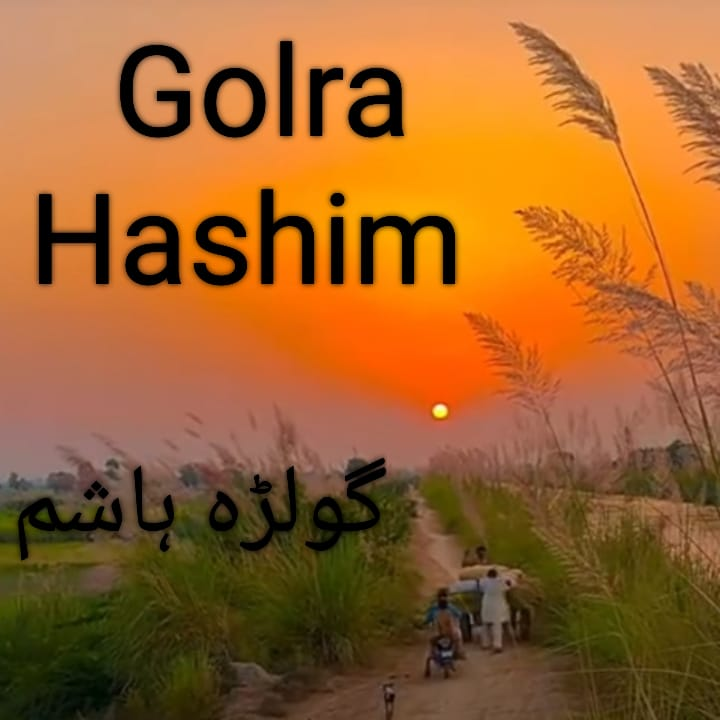
- Interactive map of Golra Hashim
- Coordinates: 32°50′17″N 73°56′56″E
- Country: Pakistan
- Province: Punjab
- District: Gujrat
- Tehsil: Kharian
- Thana: Guliana
- Union Council: U/C 92 Bhagwal

Golra Hashim Urdu pronunciation: [golrɑːhɑːshim] is a small village in Kharian Tehsil, Gujrat District in Punjab province, Pakistan. Its nearby villages are Bhagwal, Kotla Haji Shah, Jhantla, Shorian, Chak Bakhtawar, Chak Budho, and Malka. It is situated at 32° 50' 17N 73° 56' 56E. It is part of Union council Bhagwal.

== overseas Pakistani ==
Over the years Golra Hashim has maintained its traditional lifestyle, with agriculture being the primary occupation. some people went to gulf countries for job & mostly are well settled in European countries like the UK, Italy, and Greece. The village has a strong sense of community and cultural heritage, which is evident in its festivals and social practices like bull race ( Akhara bail).

== Mosques ==
The village is home to several mosques, including the main Jamia Masjid named after the first Rashidun caliph Abu Bakr Siddique which has been a central place for worship and community gatherings for many years.

== Education ==
- Government Elementary School (Boys)
- Govt Primary School (Girls)
- Two Private School in Village
- Govt High School Bhagwal

The establishment of educational institutions like the Government Elementary School for boys and girls private institution Iqra public school has played a significant role in the village and surrounding area education development.
