= Kotli (disambiguation) =

Kotli is a town in Pakistan-administered Kashmir.

Kotli may also refer to:

- Kotli District, centred on the town
- University of Kotli
- Kotli Kuppa a village in Sialkot District, Pakistan
- Kotli, Himachal Pradesh, a village in India
- Alar Kotli, Estonian architect

== See also ==
- Kotli Lions, a Pakistani cricket team
