= Dir–Chitral Motorway =

Dir–Chitral Motorway
- دیر چترال موٹروے

Route information
- Length: 30 km (19 mi)
- Existed: Proposed–present

Major junctions
- South end: Chakdara
- North end: Rabat town of Dir Lower

Location
- Country: Pakistan
- Regions: Khyber Pakhtunkhwa
- Major cities: Dir, Chitral

Highway system
- Motorways of Pakistan

The M-19 or the Dir–Chitral Motorway is a proposed motorway project in the Khyber Pakhtunkhwa province of Pakistan. The project aims to provide a major boost to tourism and trade activities throughout the region.

The initiative holds strategic significance, as it is expected to establish a vital transportation link between the Central Asian States and Pakistan. In the long term, the motorway will extend its connectivity toward Gilgit, strengthening regional trade networks and enhancing economic relations with China.

The motorway project is planned to be developed in multiple phases. Phase 1 will involve the construction between Chakdara and Rabat. A Phase 2 would extend the motorway northward from Rabat to Chitral.

== History ==
Phase 1: Chakdara → Rabat (Lower Dir)

The project is a 30-kilometre (19-mile) four-lane motorway that begins and ends within the Lower Dir district of Khyber Pakhtunkhwa. It is planned to be constructed between Chakdara and Rabat in Dir Lower and will include two tunnels, the longest of which will extend approximately five kilometers through the Ouch Mountain. The estimated cost of the project is Rs. 40 billion.

ECNEC approved the project on 10 Sep 2021. As of the beginning of 2023, the KP government had concluded the feasibility study for the project and was in the final stages of administrative documentation. The Public-Private Partnership committee had granted approval for the commercial and financial feasibility study.

== Controversies ==
The decision to put the Dir-Chitral Motorway project on hold has drawn criticism from the communities of Dir, Bajaur, and Chitral. Both political figures and civil society advocates are urging the government to resume the project within the framework of CPEC. They emphasize that this route, being the safest, shortest, and strategically crucial, would effectively connect Pakistan to the Central Asian States.
