= Daulat Nagar, Gujrat =

Town in Punjab, Pakistan

Daulat Nagar دولت نگر
- Town
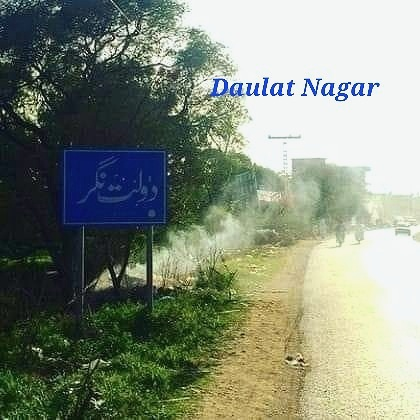

- Location within Pakistan
- Coordinates: 32°44′44″N 74°04′45″E
- Country: Pakistan
- Province: Punjab
- Division: Gujrat
- District: Gujrat
- Tehsil: Gujrat
- Thana: Daulat Nagar
- Highways: N-5; M-12

Daulat Nagar (دولت نگر) is a town and union council in Gujrat Tehsil & Gujrat District, Punjab province, Pakistan. It is situated near the villages Ghari Bhau,Lahorian Doga Sharif, Bazurgwal and Shahjahanian. Daulat Nagar is around 24 km from Gujrat.

== Notable people ==
- Diwan Chand Sharma

== Education ==
- Govt Nawab Mumtaz girls college

- Govt Boys High School
