= Lahore–Sahiwal–Bahawalnagar Motorway =

Road in Pakistan

Lahore-Sahiwal-Bahawalnagar Motorway (M-17)
- ایم ١٧ موٹروے
- لاہور ساہیوال بہاولنگر موٹروے

Route information
- Maintained by National Highway Authority (NHA)
- Length: 295 km (183 mi)

Major junctions
- North end: Lahore
- Kassuwal
- South end: Bahawalnagar

Location
- Country: Pakistan
- Provinces: Punjab
- Towns: Lahore, Kasur, Okara, Adda Gamber, Pakpattan, Sahiwal, Bahawalnagar

Highway system
- Roads in Pakistan

The M-17 or the Lahore–Sahiwal–Bahawalnagar Motorway is a proposed motorway in Punjab, Pakistan, connecting the cities of Lahore, Kasur, Okara, Pakpattan, Sahiwal, and Bahawalnagar. Spanning approximately 295 kilometres, the project was approved by the executive board of the National Highway Authority (NHA) as part of their annual maintenance plan for 2023–24. The Executive Committee of the National Economic Council (ECNEC) approved over Rs.263.79 billion for the project. The groundbreaking ceremony was held in Kasur and was attended by Prime Minister Shehbaz Sharif.

== Interchanges ==
Interchanges
No#	town/city name	interchange name
1	Lahore	Haloki-Lahore Ring Road Interchange
2	Sue-e-Asal	Sue-e-Asal Road Interchange
3	Raja Jang	Raja Jang (Mir Muhammad Sattoki) Interchange (Raiwind-Kasur Road)
4	Bhimke	Bhimke-Chunian Road Interchange
5	Allahabad	Allahabad-Chunian Road Interchange
6	Pull Dhool (Abdullah Sugar Mills)	Hujre Shah Muqeem-Chunian Road Interchange
7	Depalpur	Depalpur-Okara Road Interchange
8	Bahawlnagar	Bahawlnagar Exit Interchange (Near Okara)
9	Adda Gamber	Adda Gamber-Pakpattan Road Interchange
10	Sahiwal	Sahiwal-Pakpattan Road Interchange
11	Arif wala	Sahiwal-Arif wala Road Interchange
12	Harappa	Harappa Interchange
13	Chichawatni	Chichawatni-Burewala Road Interchange
14	Kassuwal	Kassuwal-(N-5) Interchange
15	Noorpur	Noorpur-Pakpattan Road Interchange
16	Bahawalnagar	Bahawalnagar-Chistian Road Interchange

The Lahore–Sahiwal–Bahawalnagar Motorway is an upcoming motorway undertaking in Punjab, Pakistan. The project received approval from the executive board of the National Highway Authority (NHA) within their yearly maintenance plan for the period 2023–24. This motorway aims to establish a connection between the cities of Lahore, Kasur, Okara, Pakpattan, Sahiwal, and Bahawalnagar. The Executive Committee of the National Economic Council (ECNEC) has approved over Rs.263.79 billion for this project.

The inauguration event for the project took place in Kasur, where Prime Minister Shehbaz Sharif participated and unveiled a commemorative plaque to signify the milestone. The projected timeline for the completion of the motorway is anticipated to span from 2023 to 2025, with an estimated two-year duration for the construction process.

== Route description ==
The proposed route of the motorway is anticipated to traverse the districts of Lahore, Kasur, Okara, Sahiwal, Pakpattan, and Bahawalpur. In order to finalize the PC-I (Project Concept-I) of the motorway, the National Highway Authority (NHA) has requested the deputy commissioners of these districts to provide Mauza-wise valuation tables.

== Costing ==
The Lahore–Sahiwal–Bahawalnagar (M-17) Motorway has a planned length of approximately 295 kilometres, with an estimated development cost of Rs. 436 billion. The allocated budget covers land acquisition, construction, engineering design, road safety measures, and supporting infrastructure including interchanges, service areas, and toll plazas.
