= Diwan Chand Sharma =

Pakistani politician

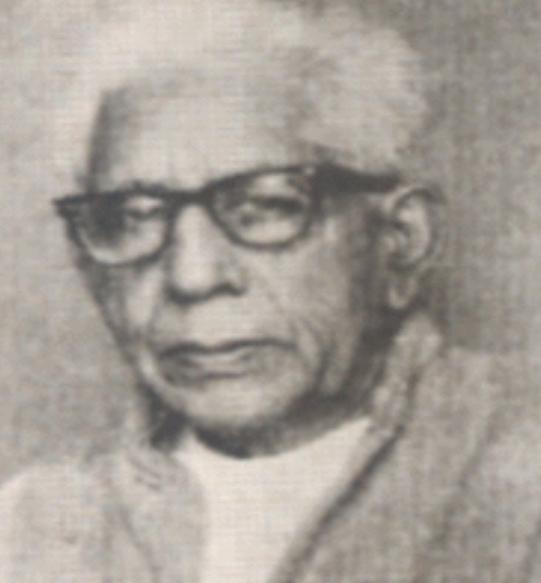

Member of Parliament, Lok Sabha
- In office 17 April 1952 – 4 April 1957
- Prime Minister: Jawaharlal Nehru
- Preceded by: constituency established
- Succeeded by: Baldev Singh
- Constituency: Hoshiarpur, Punjab
- In office 5 April 1957 – 1968
- Prime Minister: Jawaharlal Nehru; Gulzarilal Nanda; Lal Bahadur Shastri; Indira Gandhi
- Preceded by: Teja Singh Akarpuri
- Succeeded by: Prabodh Chandra
- Constituency: Gurdaspur, Punjab

Personal details
- Born: 8 March 1896 Daulat Nagar, Punjab Province, British India (modern day Gujrat District, Punjab, Pakistan)
- Died: 23 December 1969 (aged 73)
- Party: Indian National Congress

Diwan Chand Sharma (8 March 1896 – 23 December 1969) was a professor and a politician from the state of Punjab. He was elected to the Lok Sabha for four terms from 1952 to 1967.

He was born in Daulat Nagar, Punjab Province, British India. He finished his schooling at D. A. V. High School, Lahore. He then received his further education from D. A. V. College, Lahore and Presidency College, Kolkata.

He was an English professor and the Head of the Department of English at Panjab University, Chandigarh.

He was elected to the 1st Lok Sabha, in 1952, from Hoshiarpur constituency in Punjab, India. He got elected to the 2nd, 3rd and 4th Lok Sabha from Gurdaspur constituency, representing the constituency continuously from 1957 to 1968.
