= Goteriala =

Village in Punjab, Pakistan

Goteriala گوٹریالہ
- Village
- Interactive map of Goteriala
- Coordinates: 32°54′36″N 74°0′55″E
- Country: Pakistan
- Province: Punjab
- Division: Gujrat
- District: Gujrat
- Tehsil: Kharian

Goteriala (Urdu: گوٹریالہ) is a village in Kharian Tehsil, Gujrat district in Punjab, Pakistan.

== Geography ==
Goteriala in Gujrat District

Goteriala is situated near the border with Azad Kashmir and Punjab, Pakistan, approximately 25 kilometers from Kharian and 50 kilometers from Gujrat. The Union Council of Goteriala is Thutha Rai Bahadar, which is 6 kilometres to the south. The border with Azad Kashmir lies 1.5 kilometers north of the village.

Goteriala is situated in a mountainous area and the Nala Bhimber stream flows through the valley. The village hosts several graveyards, including Hafiz Siddique and Zinda Peer graveyards.

The village has between 1,500 and 2,000 houses and a population of approximately 5,000. The central mosque of Goteriala is Jamia Masjid.

== History ==
The village was founded in 1638. Its name is derived from the Punjabi phrase for old man, "baba Goto". The majority of the inhabitants are Jatt.

During the 20th century, the majority of men from Goteriala served in the Pakistan Army.

== Economy ==
The land surrounding the village is arid, so production of crops is completely dependent on seasonal rainfall. As a result, agriculture has not been the main source of income for the local population. Many of the villagers have gone overseas to find work and have set up businesses in Italy, Spain, the United States, the United Kingdom, Saudi Arabia and the United Arab Emirates

== Infrastructure ==
Electricity was introduced in 1983, and Land line telephony was introduced in 2006. One water turbine supplies fresh water, the result of a project of the World Health Organization, but they have not worked for 14 to 15 years. Many shops operate in Goteriala, mostly in the Goteriala Bazaar. Streets are paved and sewage ditches are open, but lined.

== Climate ==
The climate of this region is extreme. Winters can be extremely cold, which creates problems given the unreliable electricity supply.

== Education ==
Goteriala has had a primary school since 1905. Separate government high schools are available for boys and girls. Private schools are also available, including a girl's religious school (deobandi madrasa).
