= Bazurgwal =

Village in Punjab, Pakistan

Coordinates: 32°46′43″N 74°04′09″E

- بزرگوال
- Interactive map of Bazurgwal
- Country: Pakistan
- Province: Punjab
- District: Gujrat
- Tehsil: Kharian

Bazurgwal is a village and Union Council of Gujrat District, in the Punjab province of Pakistan. It is located at 32° 46' 43" N 74° 4' 9" E and is situated on the Bhimber Road, 30 km from Gujrat and 30 km from Bhimber. Daulat Nagar and Banian are neighbouring villages. Administratively, Bazurgwal is a part of Sabour Union Council of Kharian Tehsil.

Before the Partition of India in 1947, Bazurgwal had a large Sikh population, and three gurdwaras.

== Economy ==
Until the late 1970s, agriculture and Army were the only employment. Small land holdings and no proper source of irrigation have forced people to look for alternatives. Until the mid 1990s, the Middle East was the favourite destination for workers, but now people from Bazurgwal are working and living in America and Europe.

== Infrastructure ==
Bazurgwal has government boys and girls primary and high schools. It has also a very famous Jinnah School owned by Ch. Bashir Ahmad retired head master since 1990. Electricity came in 1966 and fixed line telephone in 1995. Although there is no specific marketplace, there are many shops in Bazurgwal. Streets are paved and sewerage channels are open but lined.

== Geography ==
Geographically Bazurgwal is situated in a plain. There is a cemetery located near the Banian village border. The "Nala Bhandar" flows on the eastern side of the village. Bhimber Road bisects the village into two halves.
