= Nala Palkhu =

Stream in Punjab, Pakistan

The Nala Palkhu or Palkhu Nala (Palkhu Stream) is a stream in Punjab, Pakistan.

== Course ==
The Nala Palkhu originates near the town of Saidpur in the Bajwat area from the Tawi River, the major left-bank tributary of the Chenab River. In addition, many small streams in the foothills of the Great Himalayas join to form a main stream, the Nala Aik, in the south of Jammu and south-east of Sialkot regions. Another stream from the Nala Aik joins the Palkhu in Indian territory before the Pakistani border. Then the Nala Palkhu flows parallel to the Chenab River, passing north of two important cities of Pakistani Punjab: Sialkot and Wazirabad. About one kilometer east of Wazirabad, the Nala Aik and Palkhu join near the locally famous "Lado Ki Pulli", a small bridge on the Aik. Downstream of the confluence point, this stream is called Nala Palkhu and forms the northern boundary of the city of Wazirabad. The Nala Palkhu crosses the Grand Trunk Road at the northern edge of Wazirabad and then flows parallel to the Chenab River until it empties into the Chenab at Head Khanki.

== History ==
Passing through Sialkot and Wazirabad, the Palkhu played a role in the development of Sialkot Cantonment and the city of Wazirabad. In Sialkot, this stream flows through the Dalowali area, which played a strategic role in the development of the Sialkot Cantonment. "After the death of Maharaja Ranjit Singh, the British officers were appointed in Sialkot. Sialkot was annexed by the British after the Second Anglo-Sikh War in 1849. The British laid the foundation of the Sialkot Cantonment in 1849 which was completed in 1852. For establishing the Sialkot Cantonment, the British Commander-in-Chief, Sir Lord Napier, surveyed and selected the area between the seasonal streams, Bher Nala and Palkhu Nala, from the point of view of defence." "The congenial climate and prospects of meeting military requisites, close proximity to the Jammu and Kashmir state, led to the genesis of Sialkot Cantt. The Sialkot Cantonment is primarily flanked by two rivulets called nullas in vernacular i.e. nullah 'Palkhu' towards the north and nullah 'Bhed' towards the south." In 1636 CE, Wazir Hakim Illmmudiddin, an amir of Shah Jahan, constructed the first ever residential building in Wazirabad, Musaman Burj, on the bank of the Palkhu Nala.

== Irrigation uses and environmental issues ==
Nala Palkhu is used for irrigation purposes throughout its entire course. About one kilometer east of Wazirabad, it is joined by the Nala Aik, which is contaminated with sewage from Sialkot and also becomes contaminated. Downstream from this point, most of Wazirabad's sewage also goes to this stream, which makes it ugly where it flows near the city.
