= Suri Sehgal =

Indian-American agriculturalist

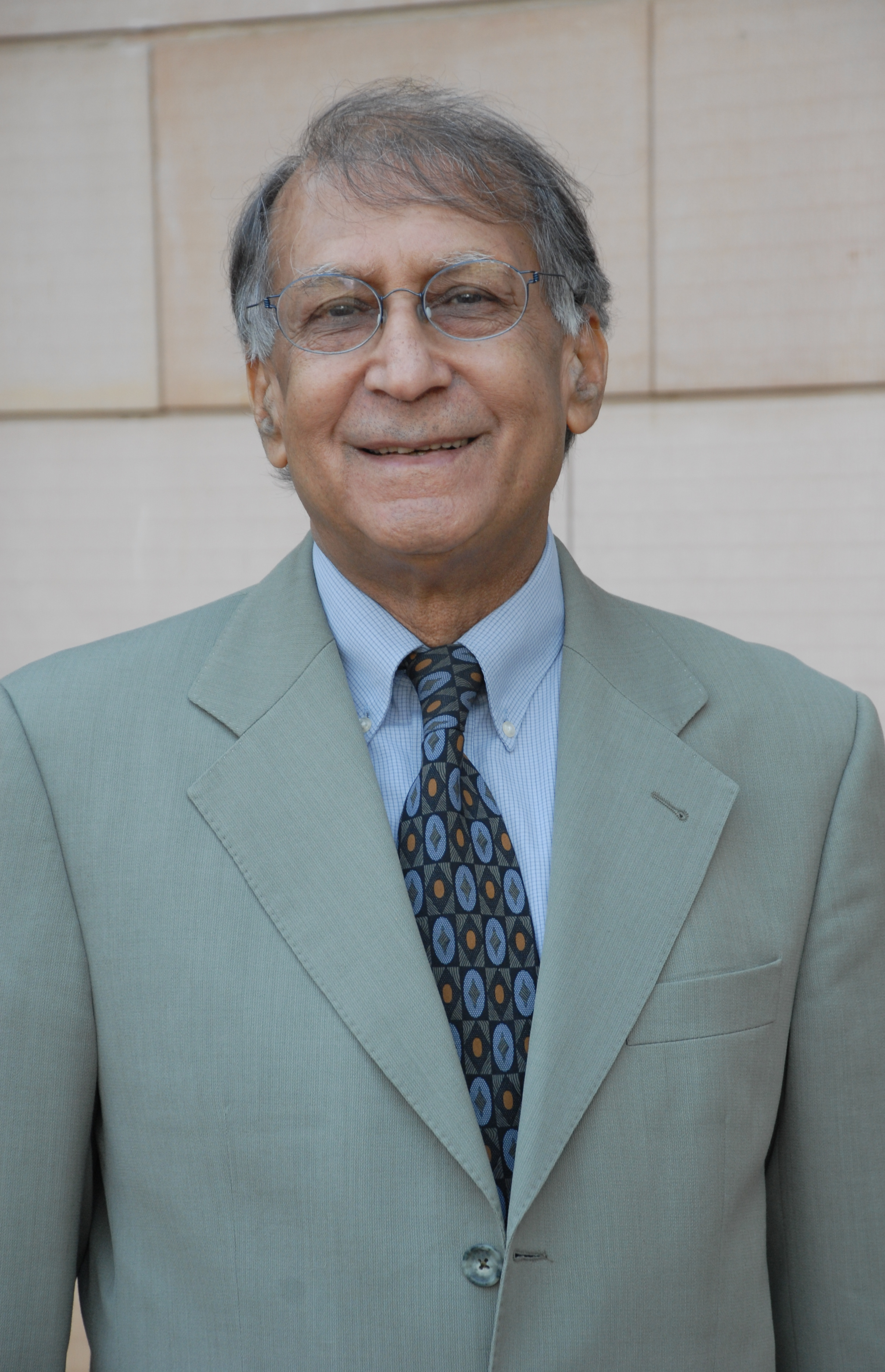
- Suri Sehgal in 2008
- Born: May 16, 1934 (age 92); Guliana, Punjab, British India (now in Punjab, Pakistan)
- Citizenship: United States
- Education: Harvard University, USA; Harvard International Senior Management Program, Switzerland; Punjab University, India
- Known for: Seed industry development, plant breeding, socioeconomic development in rural India, philanthropy S M Sehgal Foundation, India; Sehgal Foundation, USA
- Spouse: Edda Gudrun (nee Jeglinsky) Sehgal
- Children: Kenai K. Sehgal; Bernd U. Sehgal; Oliver S. Sehgal; Vicki D. Sehgal
- Scientific career
- Fields: Plant genetics, agricultural science, business, philanthropy

Surinder Mohan (Suri) Sehgal is an Indian-American crop scientist, seedsman, and businessman. His research and professional successes in the areas of plant breeding and genetics, ag biotechnology, intellectual property, business management, and seed industry development were carried out in executive capacities in several companies in the United States, Belgium, and Germany. After the divestment of a group of four seed companies that Sehgal founded and ran with his wife, Edda Sehgal, the couple created two nonprofit organizations to promote rural development in Suri's country of origin: Sehgal (Family) Foundation in 1998 in the US, and S M Sehgal Foundation in India. The foundation focuses on water security, food security, and social justice, particularly empowerment. A proponent of corporate social responsibility and environmental sustainability, Sehgal has also provided support individually and through the foundations for projects related to agriculture research, the preservation of biodiversity and the conservation of natural resources.

== Early life and education ==
Suri Sehgal was born on 16 May 1934 in the town of Guliana in the Punjab Province of British India (now in Punjab, Pakistan) into an inter-caste Punjabi family. He was the second son, and one of eight children, of a Hindu father, Faqirchand “Shahji” Sehgal, and a Sikh mother, Shushil Kaur Sehgal. Shahji Sehgal was an associate of Mahatma Gandhi in the Indian National Congress, and the family home was a center for community organizing for India's independence from British rule. Suri was thirteen when independence brought about the Partition of India in August 1947. The Sehgal family home, in the region of Punjab that became part of Pakistan, was along the route of the mass migration of people who were displaced amidst the violence that followed Partition—Hindus and Sikhs to India and Muslims from India to Pakistan. Suri ended up homeless for a time on the streets of Delhi and was a witness to horrific violence and bloodshed before being reunited with his family in a refugee camp in Amritsar, India. Suri achieved a bachelor of science and a master of science in botany at Punjab University, where he received silver medals, merit certificates, and scholarships for academic achievement in 1955 and 1957. He came to the United States in 1959 to study plant genetics and work with Paul C. Mangelsdorf at Harvard University. He received the Anna C. Ames Memorial Scholarship in 1961. He attained his Ph.D. in plant genetics from Harvard in 1963. He later (1982) completed the Harvard International Senior Management Program in Mont-Pelerin, Switzerland.

== Professional achievements ==
Sehgal's professional career began in 1963 at a (then) regional seed company in Des Moines, Iowa, founded by plant breeder and future vice president of the United States, Henry A. Wallace, called Pioneer Hi-Bred Corn Company (named Pioneer Hi-Bred International, Inc., in 1970, and Dupont Pioneer in 2012). Sehgal's tenure at Pioneer lasted 24 years. He was mentored and befriended by Pioneer executive Bill Brown (William L. Brown).

- Sehgal was Pioneer's corn breeder for the tropics and subtropics stationed in Jamaica for six years before being appointed manager of the International Department. He organized and established research and development centers, production facilities, and branch offices throughout Latin America and the Caribbean, with responsibility for hiring and training management teams. He was appointed president of Pioneer's Overseas Division in 1973, president of Pioneer Overseas Corporation in 1981, and corporate vice-president of Pioneer Hi-Bred International, Inc., in 1984.
- Until 1988, Sehgal traveled extensively through Russia, Ukraine, Western and Eastern Europe, Latin America, the Caribbean, Africa, China, and India to develop, manage, and administrate international research and business ventures. His East-West business strategy in Europe was the first of its kind in the seed industry, resulting in unprecedented profits for Pioneer. Sehgal introduced high-technology/high-profit concepts in Brazil, a global sourcing concept in Europe, and innovative ideas in the company's worldwide operations.
- Sehgal left Pioneer in 1988 and launched a seed company in India with Edda Sehgal called Proagro Seed Company Ltd., which became a leading private seed company on the Indian subcontinent over the next ten years.
- During the same period, Sehgal was chairman and CEO of Global Technologies, Inc., Des Moines, Iowa, providing agribusiness consulting and advisory services globally for seven years as a chief operating officer at Plant Genetic Systems, Belgium, (in 2002 became Bayer CropScience); for seven years as a senior advisor at KWS Kleinwanzlebener Saatzucht Ag (KWS Saat), Einbeck, Germany; and until 1997 on the board of directors for Great Lakes Hybrids, Ovid, Michigan, USA.
- Sehgal spent three years as a senior advisor at Hoechst Schering AgrEvo GmbH (named Aventis CropScience in 1999, and Bayer CropScience in 2002), Frankfurt, Germany, where he helped develop the forward integration of Plant Genetic Systems technology into AgrEvo seed businesses.
- He was on the board of trustees for the International Institute of Tropical Agriculture (IITA), Ibadan, Nigeria, and on the board of directors for Diversity, A News Journal for the International Genetic Resources Community, USA.
- Suri and Edda Sehgal divested Proagro Seed Company Ltd. in 1998 and used the bulk of the profits to create philanthropic foundations in the United States and India. That same year, the Sehgals established Global Investors LLLP, headquartered in Des Moines, Iowa, as an investment company. The only shareholders are Suri, Edda, and their four children. The Sehgal (Family) Foundation is based in Des Moines, Iowa, as a private donor foundation with the primary intent of making a positive contribution to the development of India, but also providing support to philanthropic ventures in the United States and elsewhere. Suri is chairman. Edda and the couple's four children are trustees. The recipients of their funding support include individuals and organizations making a difference in health, education, and conservation.
- Sehgal received the Dr. MS Swaminathan Award for Leadership in Agriculture for the year 2022, recognized by Trust for Advancement of Agricultural Sciences (TAAS).

== Personal life ==
Suri Sehgal met Edda Gudrun Jeglinsky (born December 25, 1941, in Breslau, Silesia) a few weeks after she first came to the United States from Germany in 1962 to live as an au pair in the home of Henry Kissinger, a professor at Harvard at the time. Suri and Edda shared a refugee past as children. Edda's family had been forced to flee from their country of origin, German Silesia, near the end of WWII. The Jeglinskys escaped to Bavaria in 1945 and settled in Göppingen, Germany. When Suri completed his Ph.D. at Harvard, he moved to Des Moines, Iowa, to work with Bill Brown at Pioneer Hi-Bred Corn Company. After completing her two-year commitment to the Kissingers, Edda moved to Des Moines, Iowa. Suri and Edda were married in the home of Bill and Alice Brown in 1964. The Sehgals raised four children, helped raise two nephews, and opened their home to other relatives who emigrated from India to the United States. The creation of their foundations and the Sehgals’ ongoing commitment to philanthropy was rooted in the violence and loss they experienced during their childhoods as refugees fleeing from their countries of origin. Both are proud Americans who want to share their good fortune.

== Current work ==
Sehgal is chairman and trustee of the Sehgal Foundation and S M Sehgal Foundation. Edda Sehgal is a trustee. S M Sehgal Foundation's mission is to strengthen community-led development initiatives to achieve positive social, economic, and environmental Agri-Business in rural India. The headquarters building in Gurgaon, now called Gurugram, in the state of Haryana, received platinum-level certification for Leadership in Energy and Environmental Design (LEED) from the US Green Building Council (USGBC).

Sehgal is the chairman of two seed companies. Misr Hytech Seed International S.A.E. in Cairo (which he helped establish with other shareholders) is a leading seed company in Egypt, breeding and developing high-yielding corn, sorghum, and squash. The other seed company, Hytech India, which Sehgal founded in 2004, develops high-yielding hybrid seeds in Hyderabad, India.

Sehgal is a Trustee Emeritus of the Missouri Botanical Garden in St. Louis, having helped to establish the William L. Brown Center of Economic Botany at the Missouri Botanical Garden in 2001.

Sehgal has been a trustee or board member of several other nonprofit organizations, including the Ashoka Trust for Research in Ecology and the Environment (ATREE) and the Trust for Advancement of Agricultural Sciences (TAAS).

== Honors, awards and international recognition ==
- Sehgal received the Pride of India Gold Award in 2007 from NRI Institute, Washington, D.C. Chapter and the Bharat Samman Lifetime Achievement Award for contributions to the development of India in 2009, also from the NRI Institute for promoting cultural, academic, and socioeconomic interests of Indian diasporas.
- For Sehgal's contributions to water management in semiarid regions, Suri Sehgal Lake was named by ICRISAT Patancheru in 2009.
- Sehgal received the Leadership in Philanthropy Award in 2011 from the American India Foundation.
- He was presented with the Global Indian Karmaveer Puraskaar Lifetime Achievement Award for Social Justice and Citizen Action in 2013 from the Indian Confederation of NGOs (iCONGO).
- A history of S M Sehgal Foundation's first fifteen years, published in 2016, called Together We Empower: Rekindling Hope in Rural India, documented the progress and successes as well as the missteps and learnings of the work done in partnership with communities. The foundation has received multiple awards for achievements and inventions in water management, agriculture development, good rural governance, community radio, and book publishing.
- Sehgal received the 2016 American Bazaar Philanthropy Award for committing the bulk of his wealth to the development and empowerment of rural India.
- Hytech Seed India was recognized with two awards at the Agri Business Summit and Agri Awards, ABSA 2021 Award for Best Field Crop Seed Company in the Agri Input Industry; and the Seedsmen Association Annual Awards 2021 under the category of Seed Entrepreneur for “valuable contributions to the farming community, in particular to the seed industry.
- Suri Sehgal was announced the winner of the MS Swaminathan Award for the year 2022 for leadership in agriculture.
