= Chak Bakhtawar =

Chak Bakhtawar چک بختاور لوہاریاں
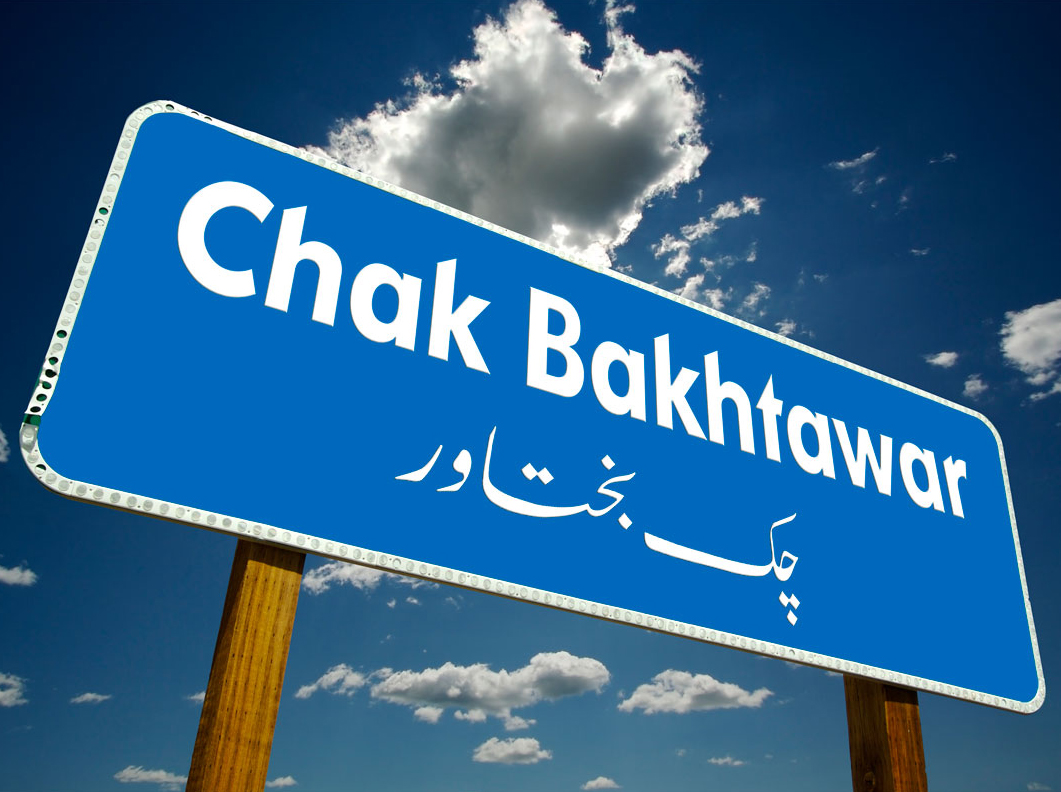
- Chak Bakhtawar Road Sign

- Location within Pakistan
- Coordinates: 32.829240°N 73.964443°E
- Country: Pakistan
- Province: Punjab
- District: Gujrat
- Tehsil: Kharian
- P/O: Chak Bakhtawar
- Elevation: 280 m (920 ft)

Population (2011)
  - Total: 5,000
- Time zone: UTC+5 (PST)
- Postal code: 50151
- Calling code: 0537

Chak Bakhtawar (Urdu: چک بختاور) is a village that is part of the Gujrat District, in the province Punjab, in Pakistan. It lies 10 kilometres (6.2 mi) from Kharian and 30 kilometres (19 mi) from the Azad Kashmir border. A majority of the people are Muslim with the majority belong to the Mughal caste, as well as few migrant families from Kashmir.

Chak bakhtawar Village

== Neighbourhoods ==
Sadkal, Bhagwal, Dham, Jand Sharif, Jhantla, Golra Hashim and Kotla Haji Shah, are nearby villages of Chak Bakhtawar, with Sadkal to the north, Bhagwal and Dham to the south, Jand Sharif to the east and Golra Hashim to the west.

Kharian Sialkot is routed near the villages mentioned above. the end points of Sialkot to Kharian are exactly south to Dham and East to Bhagwal, and a link road from this point is connecting at Al Mudassar Chowk.

== Education ==
There are two schools in Chak Bakhtawar:

- Government Elementary School Chak Bakhtawar (Boys)
- Government Primary School Chak Bakhtawar (Girls)
- 84% population is educated
- 50% population is settled abroad

== Sports ==
Village residents play cricket, volleyball, and badminton. All three games are played, and the village has won many tournaments. Arslan Idris and Imran Sadiq are the most famous sports players from the village.
