= M-12 motorway (Pakistan) =

Motorway in Pakistan

Coordinates: 32°48′51″N 73°57′31″E

M-12 motorway
- ایم ١٢ موٹروے
- Sambrial-Kharian Motorway

Route information
- Maintained by National Highway Authority
- Length: 69 km (43 mi)
- History: Under Construction completed by 2026

Major junctions
- East end: Sambrial
- West end: Kharian

Location
- Country: Pakistan
- Major cities: Gujrat; Kharian; Jalalpur Jattan; Sambrial; Sialkot; Wazirabad
- Towns: Guliana; Daulat Nagar
- Villages: Bhagwal

Highway system
- Roads in Pakistan
← M-11	→ M-13

The M-12 Motorway (Urdu: ایم ١٢ موٹروے), or the Sialkoti–Kharian Motorway, is a motorway in Pakistan, under construction since July 2022. The M-12 will connect Sambrial and Kharian. The 69 km (43 mi) long motorway will have 5 interchanges, a service area, and a 1 km (0.62 mi) long bridge spanning River Chenab. The M-12 will be a six-lane motorway with a design speed of 120 km/h (75 mph) and an expected completion time of 2 years.

The project cost of this motorway is Rs 81.97 billion.
