= Sagri (Rawalpindi) =

Populated place in Rawalpindi District, Pakistan

Sagri ساگری
- Town
- Location within Punjab, Pakistan Location within Pakistan
- Coordinates: 33°27′36″N 73°15′50″E
- Country: Pakistan
- Province: Punjab
- District: Rawalpindi
- Tehsil: Rawalpindi
- UC: Sagri

Population (2017 Pakistani census)
  - Total: 97,947
- Time zone: UTC+5 (PST)
- Postcode (ZIP): 47540
- Area code: 051

Sagri is a Town and Union council in Rawalpindi Tehsil of Rawalpindi District.

Sagri's population per 2017 Pakistani census is 97,947.
