= Gujranwala Expressway =

Expressway in Pakistan

- LSM Gujranwala Link Road
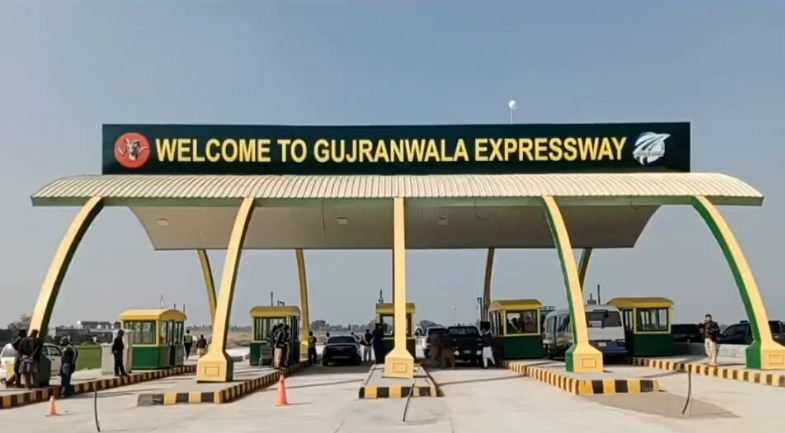
- Maintained by the National Highway Authority

Route information
- Auxiliary route of M-11
- Length: 9.4 mi (15.1 km)
- Existed: 2024–present

Major junctions
- From: Gujranwala
- To: Wahndo

Location
- Country: Pakistan
- Districts: Gujranwala District
- Major cities: Gujranwala Eminabad Wahndo

Highway system
- Expressways of Pakistan
← E-75	→ M-11

Disclaimer: Although this is a spur route of the Lahore Sialkot Motorway (M-11), this highway is not designated or signed as M-11 Motorway. This is a spur that links the city of Gujranwala to M-11. Gujranwala Expressway is an expressway in Pakistan linking Gujranwala to the Lahore-Sialkot Motorway which makes it an auxiliary route of the M-11 motorway or a bypass from the Grand Trunk Road. It is an important road as it brings a faster connection between Gujranwala and the M-11 motorway. It is a 15.2-kilometre (9.4 mi) highway. Gujranwala Expressway is also equipped with M-TAG. It was inaugurated in 2024.

== History ==
Gujranwala was isolated from motorways, with the M-11 motorway being the closest but the N-5 highway would be the easiest way to get there. Commuters traveling to Lahore had to rely on the congested N-5.

=== Construction ===
Construction began in July 2023, with the Frontier Works Organization (FWO) given the task to complete the project. In a rapid five months, the project was completed and the expressway was inaugurated on February 5, 2024.

== Usefulness ==
Gujranwala Expressway is a very useful highway as it helps people from Gujranwala to get to Lahore faster. Gujranwala Expressway has reduced time travel between Gujranwala and Lahore to 45 minutes.

== Junctions ==
Gujranwala Expressway
Exits	Exit Number	Eastbound Exits	Westbound Exits
Gujranwala Interchange		No eastbound exits, westbound entrance	N-5 to Lahore
Wahndo Interchange		M-11 to Lahore	M-11 to Sialkot
