= Doga Sharif =

Village in Punjab, Pakistan

Doga Sharif (ڈوگہ شریف) is a village in Gujrat District of Punjab, Pakistan, on the Bhimber Road at 32°43'42"N 74°4'37"E.
