= Thutha Rai Bahadar =

Thutha Rai Bahadar ٹھوٹھہ رائے بہادر
- Town and union council
- Location in Pakistan
- Coordinates: 32°53′10″N 73°59′30″E
- Country: Pakistan
- Province: Punjab
- District: Gujrat
- Tehsil: Kharian
- Time zone: UTC+5 (PST)
- Postal code: 50180
- Area code: 053

Thutha Rai Bahadar is a town and union council of Gujrat District, in the Punjab province of Pakistan. It is one of the biggest village of the Chib Rajput tribe in Gujrat. Part of Kharian Tehsil, the village is located at an altitude of 306 metres (1,007 feet).

== Surrounding villages ==
- Goteriala
- Malikpur jattan
- Lehri
- Samrala
- Kana Karam Khan
- Hassam
- Sadwal
