= Kotla Haji Shah, Gujrat =

Village in Punjab, Pakistan

Kotla Haji Shah کوٹلہ حاجی شاہ
- Village
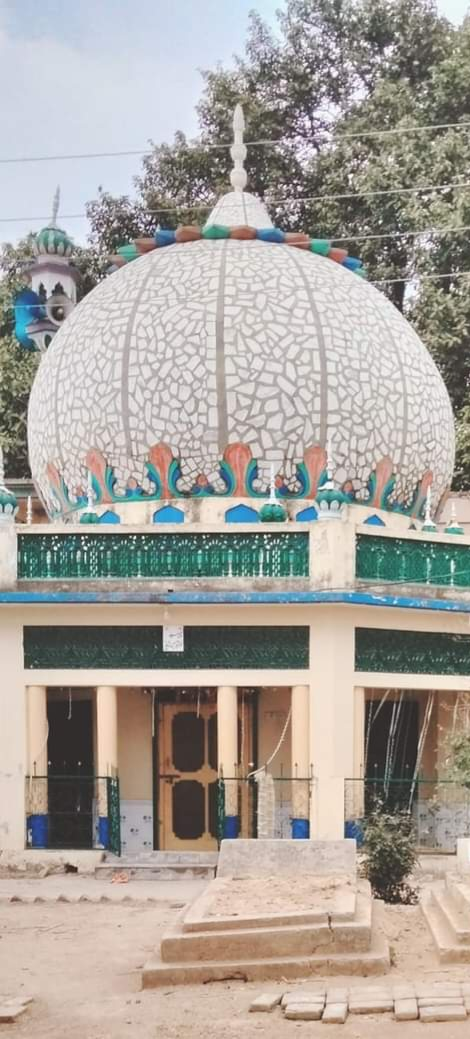
- Nickname: Kotla
- Interactive map of Kotla Haji Shah
- Coordinates: 32°50′34″N 73°57′01″E
- Country: Pakistan
- Province: Punjab
- Division: Gujrat
- District: Gujrat
- Tehsil: Kharian
- union council: Bhagwal

Kotla Haji Shah (Urdu pronunciation: [kotlɑːhɑːji shɑːh]) is a historic village in Gujrat District, in the Punjab province, Pakistan. It is part of Bhagwal union council in Kharian Tehsil. It is located about 12 km northeast of Kharian city, and has a population of about 2,000 people.

== History ==
The village is named after a prominent local Muslim Sufi saint Baba Gi Sayed Haji Shah. The village's former name is Kotla Sahdan. The village has a simple and traditional lifestyle, with agriculture being the main source of income as well as some peoples went to foreign countries for work. The village has a mosque, a school, & graveyard. The village is known for its hospitality and generosity, as well as its love for sports, especially cricket and kabaddi. The village celebrates various festivals and occasions, such as Eid, annual Urs Mubarak of Baba Haji Shah Sahib on 21 and 22 June every year.

== Neighborhood ==
The village has a strong sense of community and brotherhood, and maintains good relations with the neighboring villages. nearby villages are Golra Hashim, Shorian, Bhattian, Bhagwal, Jhantla, and Chak Bakhtawar.
