= Adda Gamber =

Town in Punjab, Pakistan

Adda Gamber اڈا گیمبر
- Town
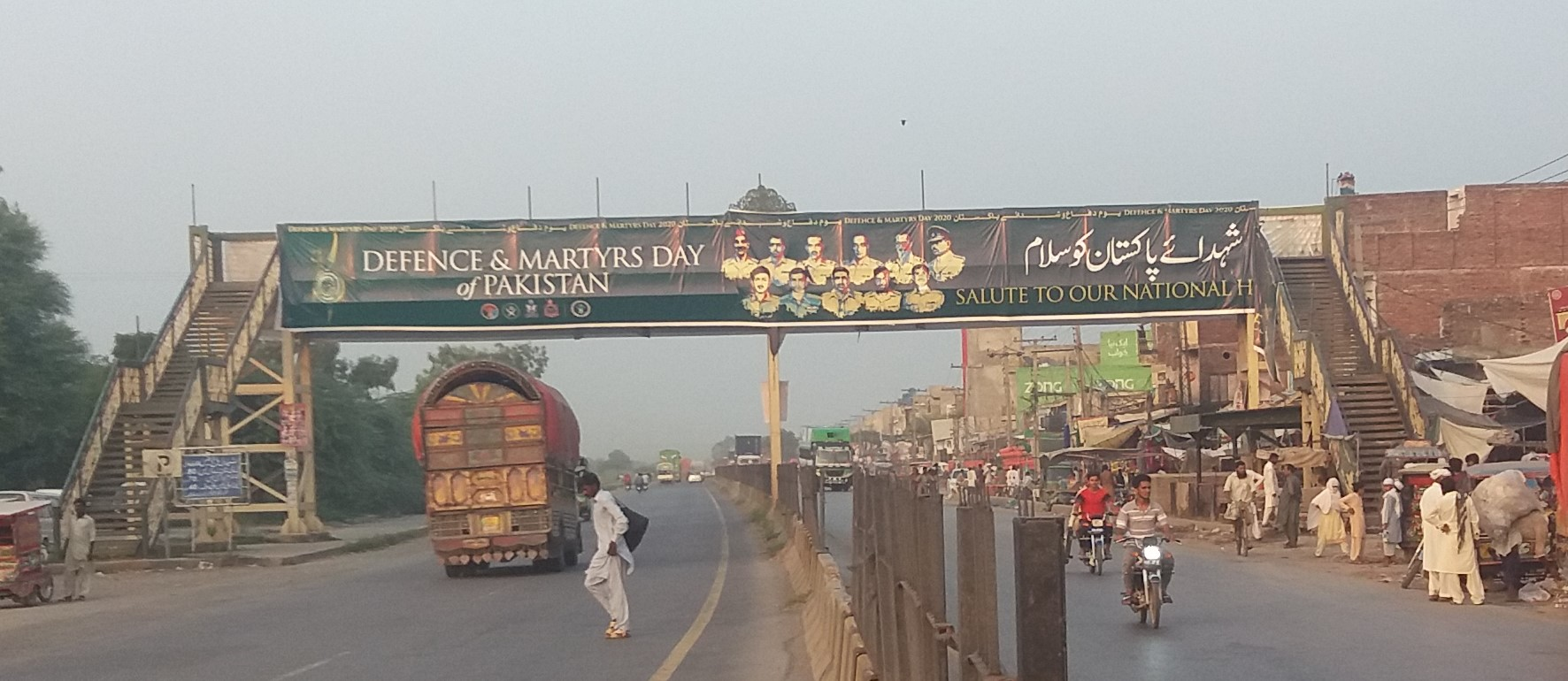
- Adda Gamber Overhead Bridge
- Interactive map of Adda Gamber
- Coordinates: 30.746°N 73.331°E
- Country: Pakistan
- Province: (Punjab, Pakistan) Punjab
- Division: Sahiwal
- District: Sahiwal
- Time zone: UTC+05:00 (PST)
- Postal code: 57460

Adda Gamber (Punjabi and Urdu: اڈا گیمبر) is a town located between District Okara and District Sahiwal in Punjab. Adda Gamber lies near Okara Cantt and falls within the revenue limits of District Sahiwal.

== Location ==
Situated on the G.T. Road, near Okara Cantonment, Adda Gamber is approximately 11 km from Okara City and 25 km from Sahiwal. Adda Gamber is located contiguous to Chak No 52/5-L.

== Railway Station ==
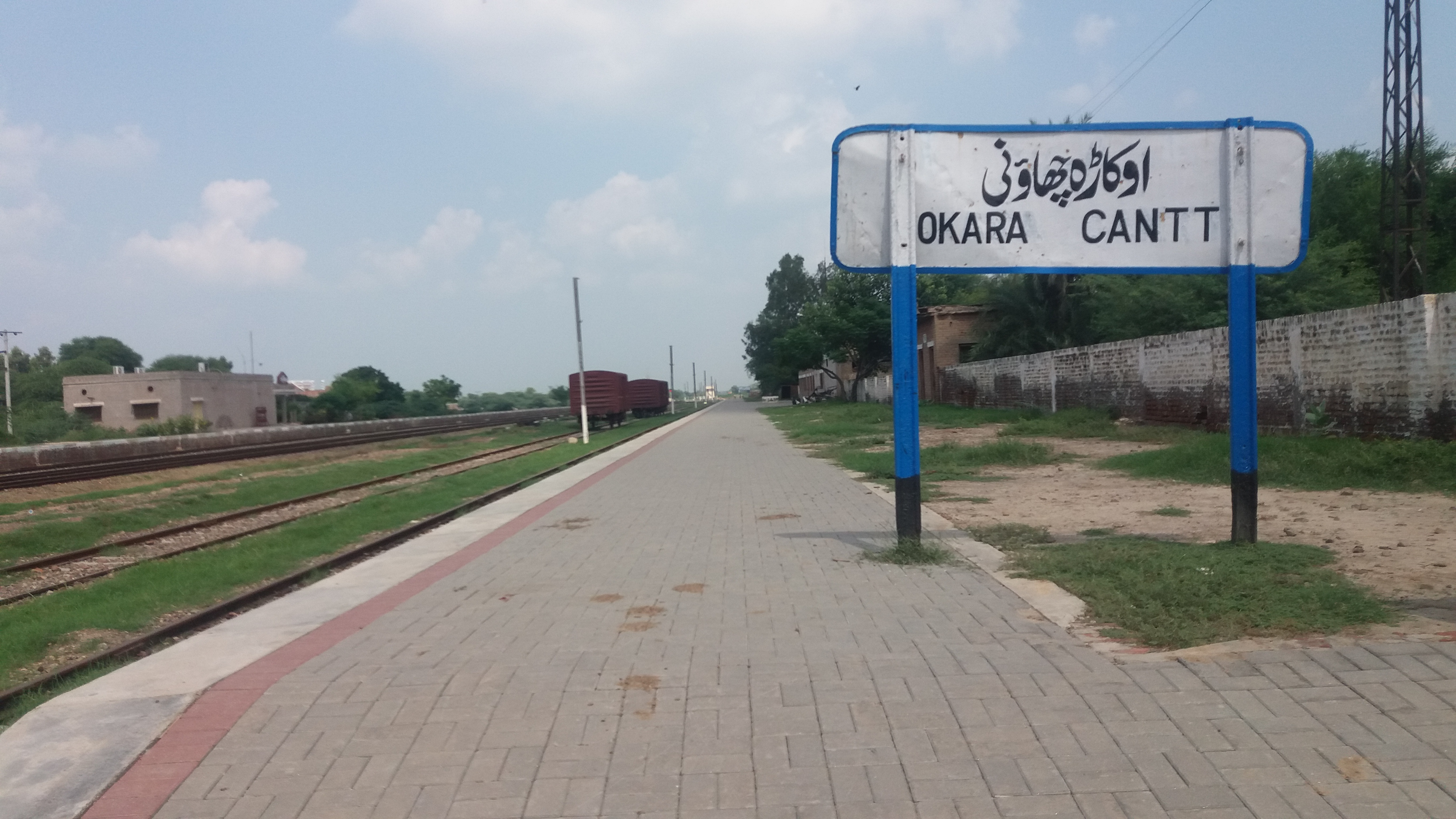
Adda Gamber (Okara Cantt) Railway Station

The Railway Station of Adda Gamber is called Okara Cantt Railway Station. Its old Name was Gamber Station. The station Code of Okara Cantt Railway Station is OKC.

=== Train Accident ===
At Adda Gamber Railway station, On 29 September 1957 a Karachi-bound Express passenger train bumped into a stationary oil train. Almost 300 people were killed and 150 were injured in that accident.

== Politics ==
Politically Adda Gamber is in District Sahiwal.

This is under the Both Systems, District Council Sahiwal and Cantonment board. But mainly Controled by the Military Land and Cantonment Department
