= Mansehra–Muzaffarabad–Mirpur Expressway =

Road in Pakistan

Route information
- Length: 200 km (120 mi)

Major junctions
- North end: Mansehra
- South end: Mirpur

Location
- Country: Pakistan
- Regions: Khyber Pakhtunkhwa, Azad Jammu and Kashmir
- Major cities: Mansehra, Muzaffarabad, Mirpur

Highway system
- Roads in Pakistan

The Mansehra–Muzaffarabad–Mirpur Expressway (MMM Expressway) is a proposed expressway project in Pakistan, connecting the cities of Mansehra, Muzaffarabad, and Mirpur. The project is part of the China-Pakistan Economic Corridor (CPEC) and is considered of exceptional significance by the Azad Jammu and Kashmir government.

The initiative aims to boost industrial expansion in manufacturing and exports. Concerning its environmental effects, both the Pakistani and AJK governments are dedicated to preventing any environmental harm and adhering to the most rigorous environmental regulations. Comprehensive Environmental Impact Assessment (EIA) findings are incorporated into every developmental endeavor. Additionally, the initiative is anticipated to encourage sustainable tourism and create pathways for biological and wildlife preservation.

== Background ==
The MMM Expressway is a four-lane divided expressway that covers about 200 kilometers. Its purpose is to connect various districts within the state, contributing to the overall social and economic development. This expressway is anticipated to cut down travel time between Jehlum and Mansehra from five hours to two and a half hours.

Although there has been advancement, certain CPEC projects in Azad Kashmir, including the MMM Expressway, have encountered obstacles and experienced delays. These delays lead to increased expenses and impede the state's economic growth and regional connections. To tackle these challenges, relevant ministries and divisions have been instructed to present proposals addressing the issues faced in their respective projects.

The executive board of the National Highway Authority (NHA) has given the approval for the construction of the MMM Expressway by approving its PC-1. This comes after the completion of thorough feasibility studies and detailed project design.

== Connection to Hazara Motorway ==
The Mansehra–Muzaffarabad–Mirpur Expressway is connected to the Hazara Motorway via Pano Dheri and Gujjar Galli. The federal government has approved PKR 2 billion for the construction of the Potha Interchange that will connect the Hazara Motorway with the MMM Motorway. This interchange will decrease travel time for the residents of Mansehra City and surrounding areas who had to use the Qalandarbad Interchange through the Karakoram Highway to reach the Hazara Motorway.
