= Dalowali =

Dalowali ﮈﺍ ﻟﻮﻭﺍ ﻟﯽ
- Suburban Village
- Location within Pakistan
- Coordinates: 32°31′26.86″N 74°36′19.00″E
- Country: Pakistan
- Province: Punjab
- Founder: Dalah Singh
- Named for: Establishing Dalowali

Government
  - MNA: Armaghan Subhani (PML-N)
  - National Assembly of Pakistan: Armaghan Subhani
  - MPA: Rana Muhammad Iqbal Harna s/o Rana Sardar Khan
- Elevation: 256 m (840 ft)

Population
  - Estimate (2010): 15,000
- Time zone: UTC+5
- Postal code: 51310
- Calling code: 052

Dalowali (Urdu: ﮈﺍ ﻟﻮﻭﺍ ﻟﯽ) is a suburban village located in eastern part of Sialkot on Jammu Road, Punjab, Pakistan. Located 256 meters above sea level, it is 7 km from the Indian border village of Sujeet Ghar and neighbouring Sialkot Cantonment. The Indian border accompanying Sialkot is of the state of Jammu and Kashmir; Dalowali is only 30.3 km away from the main Jammu City (winter capital of Jammu and Kashmir).

== Climate ==
Climate data for Dalowali, Sialkot, Pakistan
Month	Jan	Feb	Mar	Apr	May	Jun	Jul	Aug	Sep	Oct	Nov	Dec	Year
Mean daily maximum °C (°F)	18 (64)	21 (69)	26 (78)	33 (91)	39 (102)	40 (104)	35 (95)	33 (91)	34 (93)	32 (89)	26 (78)	20 (68)	29 (84)
Mean daily minimum °C (°F)	5 (41)	8 (46)	12 (53)	18 (64)	23 (73)	26 (78)	26 (78)	25 (77)	23 (73)	17 (62)	10 (50)	5 (41)	16 (60)
Average precipitation cm (inches)	4.1 (1.6)	4 (1.6)	4.4 (1.7)	2.1 (0.8)	1.7 (0.7)	6.8 (2.7)	27.1 (10.7)	25.6 (10.1)	13.2 (5.2)	1.4 (0.6)	1.1 (0.4)	2.1 (0.8)	93.6 (36.8)
Source: Weatherbase
