= Kotli Kopa =

Village in Pakistan

Kotli Kuppa کوٹلی کپہ
- Village
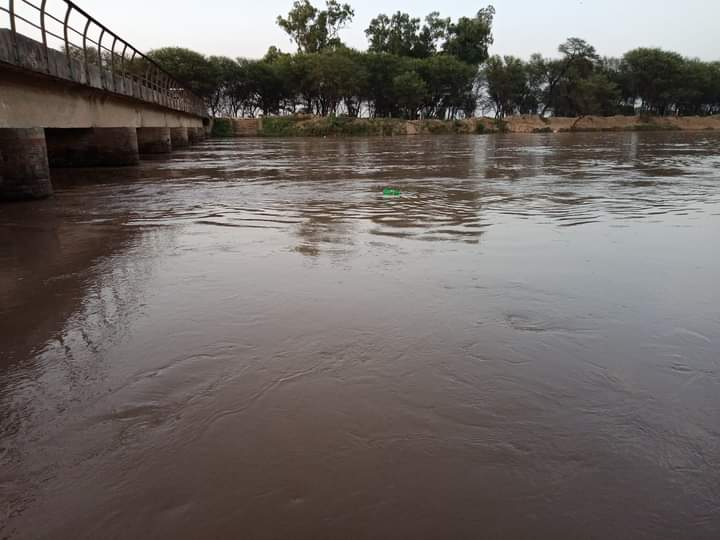

- Location within Pakistan
- Coordinates: 32°18′15″N 74°22′55″E
- Country: Pakistan
- Province: Punjab
- Division: Gujranwala
- District: Sialkot
- Tehsil: Daska
- Thana: Daska Saddar
- union council: Raja Ghuman
- Time zone: UTC+5 (PST)
- Highways: M-11

Kotli Kuppa is a medium size village in Daska Tehsil, Sialkot District, in the Punjab province of Pakistan. The village is part of the Union Council Raja Ghumman. Nearby villages are Watalian, and Raja Ghumman. The M-11 motorway is routed near village. Koti Kuppa is around 5 kilometres from Daska tehsil and 32 km from Sialkot International Airport.

== Education ==
There are two government schools and are one private one in the village.

- Govt Boys primary school
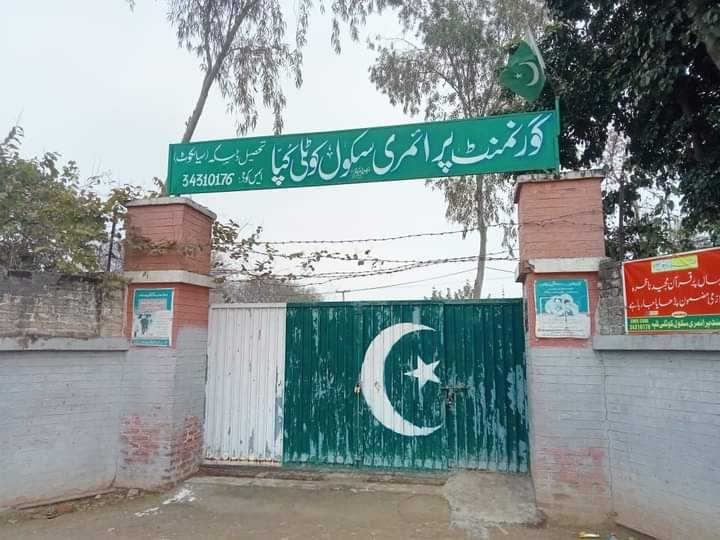
Government primary schoolا

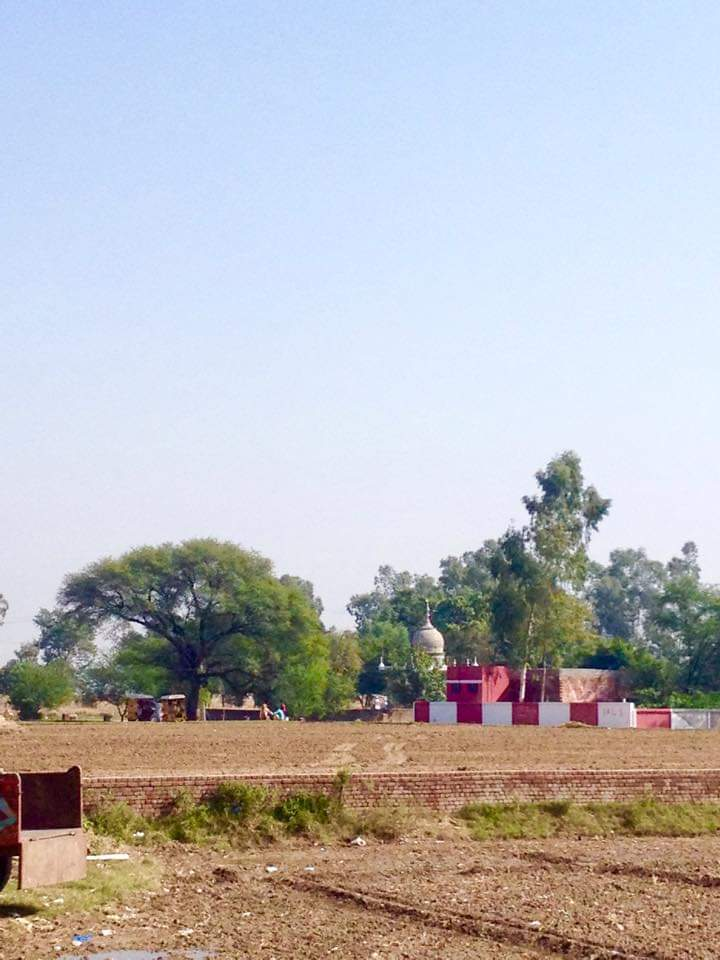
Government school
- Govt Girls primary school
