= Jand Sharif =

Jand Sharif جنڈ شریف
- Location within Pakistan
- Coordinates: 32.822289°N 73.9756567°E
- Country: Pakistan
- Province: Punjab
- District: Gujrat
- Tehsil: Kharian
- P/O: Gulyana
- Elevation: 280 m (920 ft)

Population (2014)
  - Total: 4,000
- Time zone: UTC+5 (PST)
- Calling code: 0537
- Website: Jand Sharif on Facebook

Jand Sharif (Urdu: جنڈ شریف) is a village in Gujrat District, Punjab province, Pakistan. It lies 10 kilometres (6.2 mi) from the Azad Kashmir border. All peoples are Muslim and most of people belong to the community. 80% of people are Sunni, 10% Shia and 10% are Deobandi. The mazar of Hafiz Alim Din & Bore Waly Sarkar is situated in Jand Sharif. In this village there are three mosques and an Imam bargah. The road connecting Guliana with chowki Samahni, Kotli passes through this town. On both sides of this road are fertile lands. Major crops of this region are wheat, maize and millet. Closest villages include Dadu Barsala, Chak Bakhtawar, Bhagwal Sadkal, Kotli Bajar, Ram Garh and Guliana. A bus stop is also named Loharian Chowk (Loharian is former name of Chak Bakhtawar).

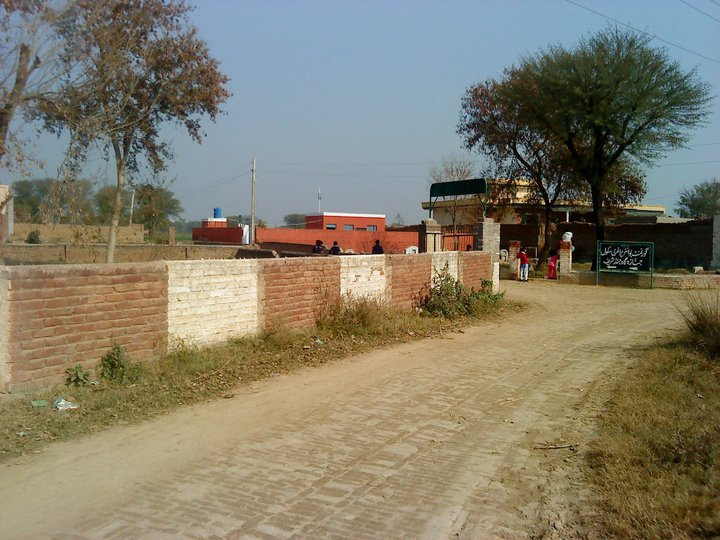
Government primary school Jand Sharif (Boys)
