= Bhagwal, Gujrat =

Village in Punjab, Pakistan

Bhagwal بھگوال
- Village
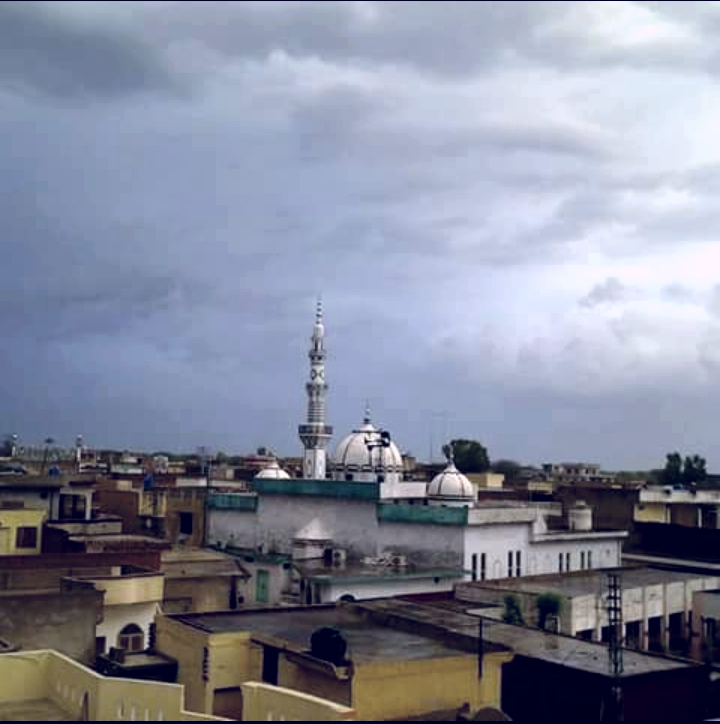
- Interactive map of Bhagwal
- Location of Bhagwal in Punjab, Pakistan and on the World Map Bhagwal (Pakistan) Bhagwal (Earth)
- Coordinates: 32°49′16″N 73°57′19″E
- Country: Pakistan
- Province: Punjab
- Division: Gujrat
- District: Gujrat
- Tehsil: Kharian
- Police Circle: Kharian Circle
- Police Station: Guliana

Government
  - Government type: Local government
  - Union Council-92: Bhagwal
  - Justice system: District and Session Courts
  - Kanungoi Circle: Kharian
  - Patwar Circle: Bhagwal
- Elevation: 303 m (994 ft)

Population
  - Total: 10,669
- Demonym: Bhagwalian

Languages
  - Official: English, Urdu
  - Regional: Punjabi
- Time zone: UTC+5 (PST)
- Postal Code: 50151
- Telephone code: 92-0537"Gujrat dialing code". Archived from the original on 3 September 2014.
- ISO 3166 code: PK-PB
- Vehicle registration: GTJ
- Highways: N-5; M-12; M-13
- Nearest city: Kharian, Lalamusa, Kotla Arab Ali Khan, Gujrat
- Nearest Airport: SKT
- Climate: Bhagwal "Gujrat Punjab Pakistan Climate".
- Avg. summer temperature: 32 °C (90 °F)
- Avg. winter temperature: 12 °C (54 °F)
- Website: https://sites.google.com/view/bhagwalpakistan/home

Bhagwal (Note: Punjabi, Urdu: بھگوال) Urdu pronunciation: [bhɑːgˌwɑːl] (Punjabi, Urdu: بھگوال) is a village and union council of Kharian Tehsil, Gujrat District, in the Punjab province of Pakistan. Bhagwal is approximately 131 kilometres (81 mi) from the national capital Islamabad.

== Geography and transportation ==
Bhagwal is located near key transportation routes Grand Trunk Road and the under-construction M-12 (Kharian-Sialkot) motorway, and connects to Al Mudassar Chowk via a link road. Nearby villages are Guliana, Golra Hashim, Kotla Haji Shah, Jhantla, Shorian, Dham Dhal Gujjar Lammay Chak Bakhtawar and Jand Sharif.

The village falls under the revenue limits of Kanungoi Circle Kharian and Patwar Circle Bhagwal. a Kanungoi Circle is headed by a Kanungo (also Qanungo) and a Patwar Circle is headed by a Patwari (Punjabi, Urdu: پٹواری).

== Demographics and economy ==
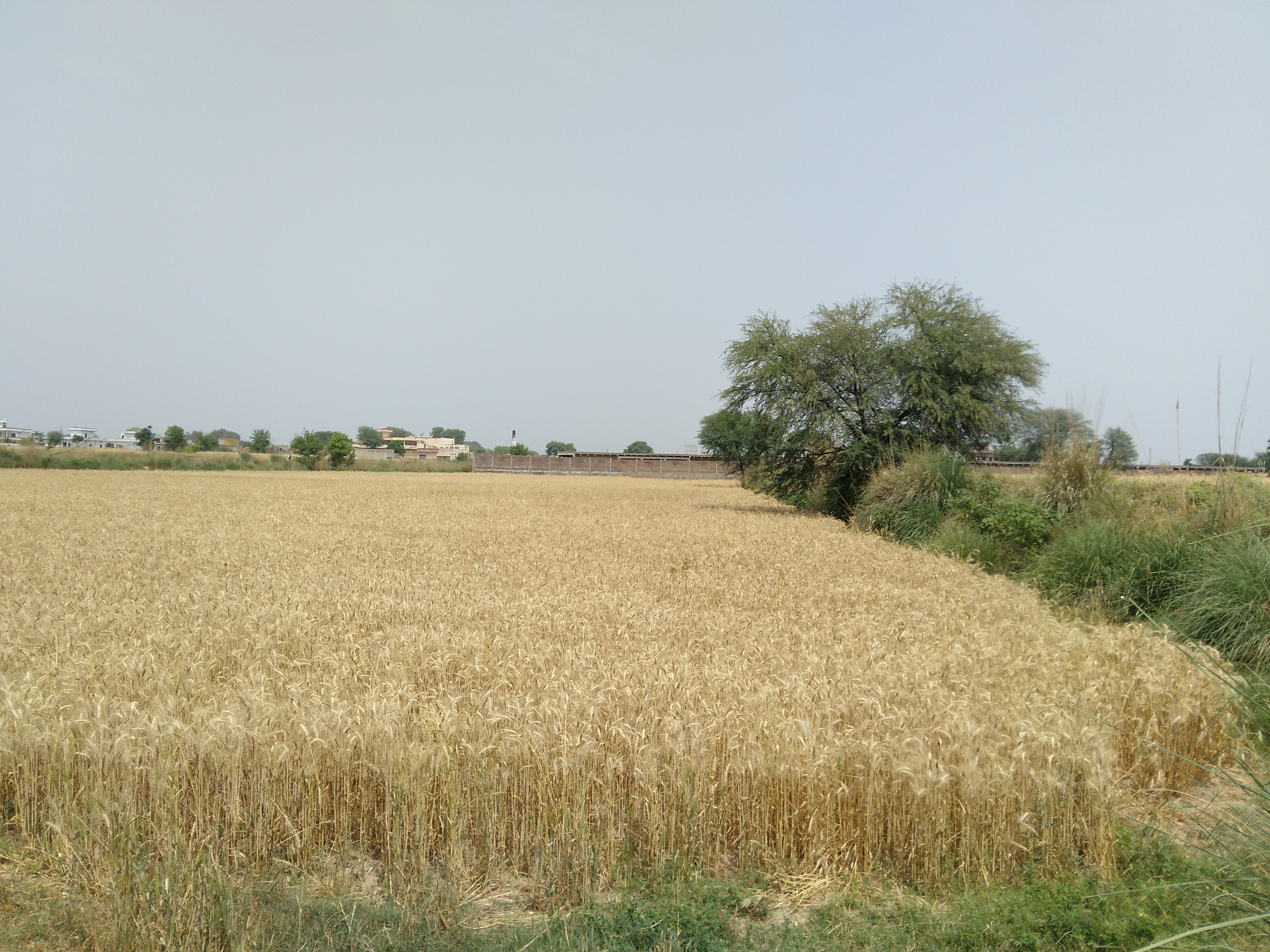
Bhagwal wheat field

According to the 2017 Pakistani census, 96.50% of the population spoke Punjabi, the main language of Bhagwal. Urdu, the national language, is spoken widely while English is spoken by educated elite.

Most peoples from Bhagwal have agriculture businesses here which are the backbone of the economy. The principal crops are wheat, maize, rice, sugarcane and vegetables.

== Landmarks and education ==
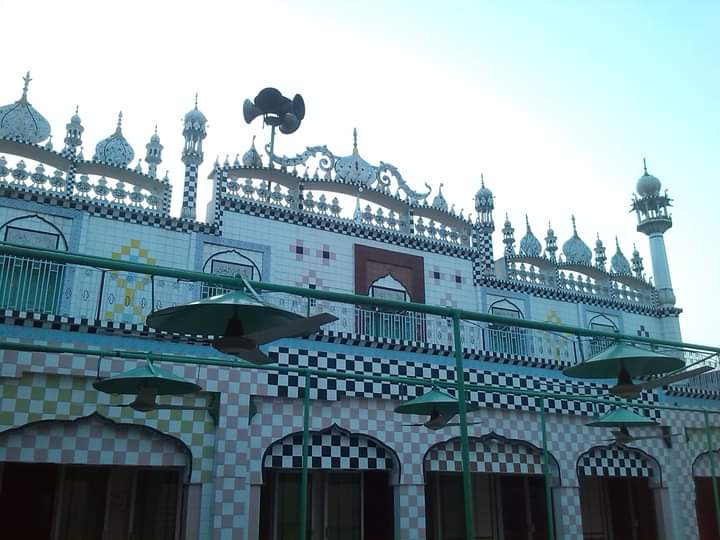
Jamia Mosque Gulzar-e Madina Bhagwal

Bhagwal has 6 mosques.

Bhagwal has four government and two private schools, which cater to the needs of the students from the village and the surrounding areas. The schools offers courses in Urdu, English, mathematics, science, and social studies. The schools also organize various co-curricular and extracurricular activities, such as sports, debates, quizzes, and cultural programs. The village has produced many eminent scholars, teachers, doctors, Army officers, engineers, lawyers, and other professionals, who have contributed to the development of the country and around the world.

- Govt High School Bhagwal (Boys)
- Government Elementary School Bhagwal (Boys)
- Government High School Bhagwal (Girls)
- Government Primary School Bhagwal (Girls)
- 02 Private Schools in Western Bhagwal
