= Sambrial =

City in Punjab, Pakistan

Sambrial سمبڑيال
- City
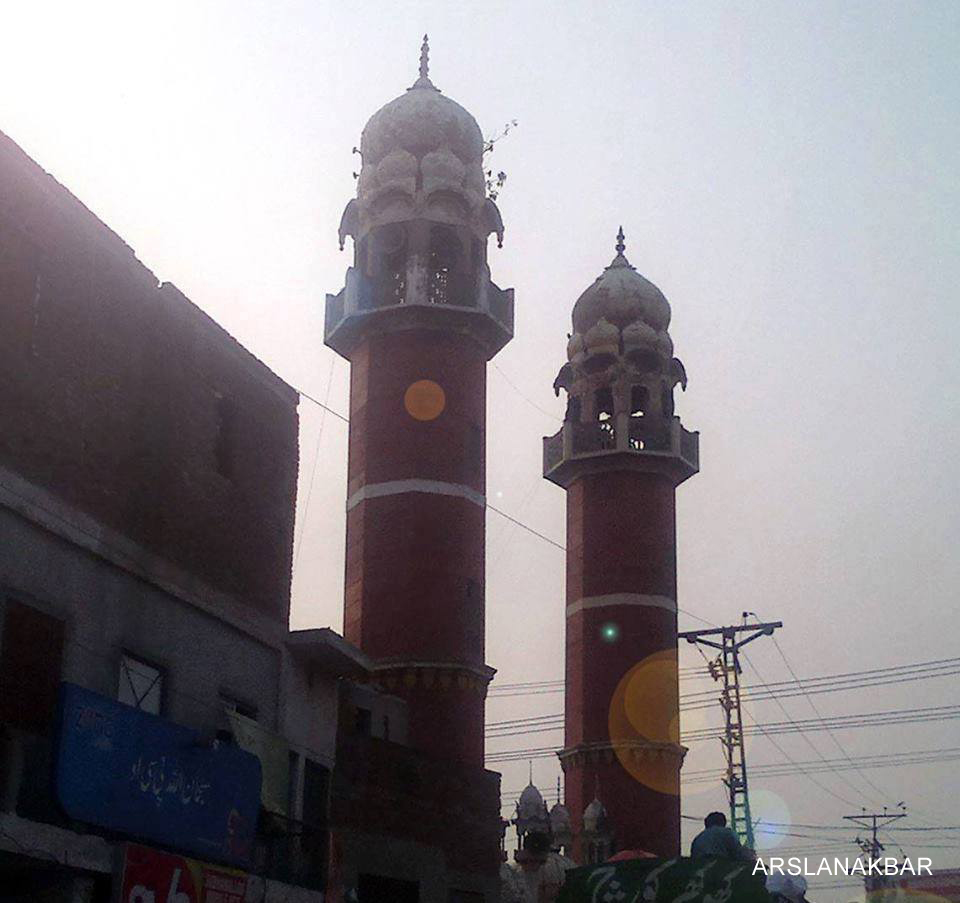
- Moor Masjid

- Location within Punjab, Pakistan Location within Pakistan
- Coordinates: 32.16°N 74.40°E
- Country: Pakistan
- Province: Punjab
- Division: Gujranwala
- District: Sialkot

Government
  - Type: Municipal Committee
- Elevation: 238 m (781 ft)

Population (2023 census)
  - City: 119,571
  - Rank: 104th in Pakistan
- Time zone: UTC+5 (PST)
- Calling code: 052

Sambrial (Punjabi / Urdu: سمبڑيال, Punjabi pronunciation: [sɐ̃mᵊɽĕˌäːl], Urdu pronunciation: [sə̃mbɽijɑːl]) is a city in Sialkot District in the Punjab province of Pakistan. It is the capital of Sambrial Tehsil, an administrative subdivision of the district. Sialkot Dry Port is located in Sambrial. Sialkot International Airport is also located near Sambrial. It is the 90th most populous city of Pakistan.

== Geography ==
The city is situated on the bank of Upper Chenab Canal and to the west of the district capital Sialkot. The tehsil of Sambrial, a tehsil of Sialkot District, comprises 160 villages which are politically organized under 17 union councils in 2017.

== Demographics ==
=== Population ===
Historical population
Year	Pop.	±% p.a.
1951	4,919	—
1961	7,750	+4.65%
1972	14,300	+5.73%
1981	24,432	+6.13%
1998	49,574	+4.25%
2017	109,479	+4.26%
2023	119,571	+1.48%

According to 2023 census, Sambrial had a population of 119,571.

Languages

Languages of Sambrial MC (2023 Census)
1. Punjabi (87.6%)
2. Urdu (9.10%)
3. Pashto (1.50%)
4. Mewati (1.10%)
5. Others (0.70%)

== Transport ==
In mid-2022, the National Highway Authority (NHA) started constructing the 69 km Kharian-Sambrial motorway, expanding Lahore-Sialkot motorway (M-11). The estimated cost of the project was Rs 42 billion, and work had begun at Kharian.

Officials stressed the need for quality roads and material, and for link roads to be built to connect cities. The government hopes to provide better travel facilities and reduce travel time. The first 35 km phase has started from Kharian. Link roads to connect cities should also be built with quality materials. The government hopes to reduce travel time and provide better facilities.

The NHA earmarked 4,600 acres of land in three tehsils, and a sum of Rs 13 billion allocated for compensation to the affected owners and utility services.

== Photo gallery ==
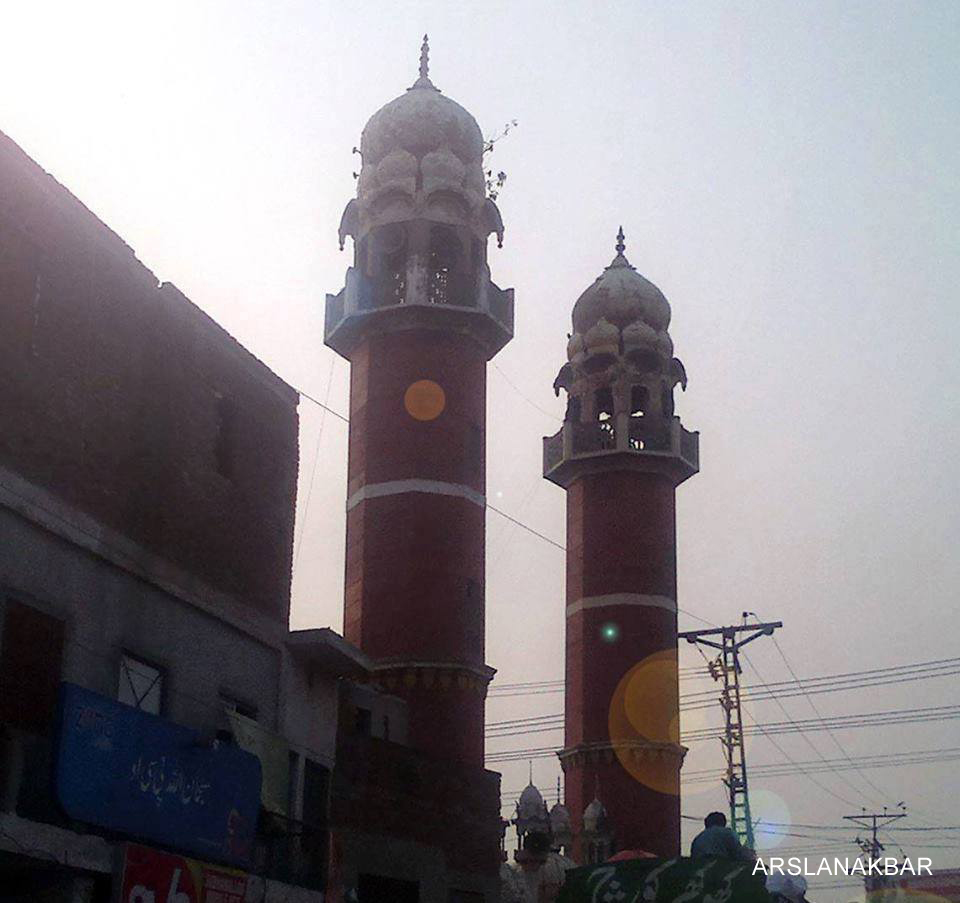
Moor Masjid Sambrial
