= Kharian Cantonment =

Town in Punjab, Pakistan

Kharian Cantt کھارِیاں کینٹ
- Kharian Cantonment
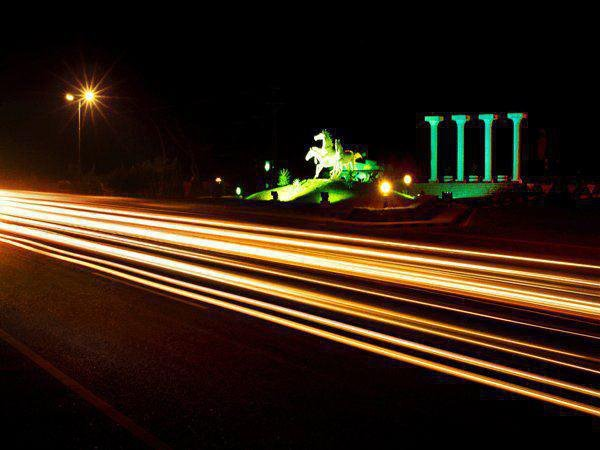
- The entrance of Kharian Cantonment

- Location within Pakistan
- Coordinates: 32.48°N 73.53°E
- Country: Pakistan
- Province: Punjab
- District: Gujrat

Population (2014)
  - Total: 204,462
- Time zone: UTC+5 (PST)
- Calling code: +92-537; Postal Code 50070
- Administrative Control; Cantonment Board Kharian

Kharian Cantonment (Urdu: کھاریاں چھاؤنی۔), (Punjabi: کھاریاں ﮐﻴﻨٹ) or Kharian Cantt is one of the largest cantonments (army bases) in Pakistan. It is located in Kharian, in the Gujrat district of Punjab province.

The cantonment is located about 130 kilometers northwest of Lahore, the capital of the Punjab province. Kharian Cantt is home to a number of military installations and is a hub of the Pakistan Army. The town is also home to a number of schools, hospitals, and other amenities.

== History ==
Construction of Kharian Cantonment began late in 1956. Roads, railway lines, fuel-storage tanks, a sewage system and treatment plant were constructed for 5,000 troops. The construction work was slowed down in October–November 1956 due to the Suez Crisis. By the end of 1957, Contractor had completed over 350 buildings and had work pending for another two fiscal years to complete the facilities for troops.

The Large Army Base at Kharian called for a multiyear project to build facilities on 1,618 ha (4,000-acre) area to adjust 15000 Troops of Pakistan Armored Division. USACE (U.S Army Corps of Engineers) constructed new facilities by the start of 1958 and provided space for Five Thousand Troops. The work programmed for FY 1959 projected facilities for another Five Thousand Soldiers.

Construction of Kharian Cantt was successfully completed with the cooperation of USACE in 1959. It became one of the largest cantonment in Pakistan and second largest cantonment in the World.

== Facts ==
- Kharian Cantt is located near a number of tourist attractions, including the Katas Raj Temple complex and the city of Lahore.
- The town is known for its lush gardens and parks, which provide a welcome respite from the hot summer temperatures. Some popular parks in Kharian Cantt include the Model Park and the Children's Park.
- Kharian Cantt is home to a number of shopping centers and markets, where you can find a variety of goods and products. The town is also home to a number of restaurants and cafes, offering a range of local and international cuisines.
- The town is well-connected to other parts of Pakistan by road and rail. The Lahore-Peshawar Motorway passes through Kharian Cantt, and the town is also served by a railway station.
- Kharian Cantt is home to a number of schools and educational institutions, including the Army Public School and College and the Government Higher Secondary School.
- The town is home to a number of military units, including the Pakistan Army's 17th Infantry Division and the 37th Infantry Division.
- Kharian Cantt is located in the Gujrat District, which is known for its agricultural production. The district is a major producer of wheat, sugarcane, and other crops.
- The town is located near a number of historical and cultural sites, including the Rohtas Fort and the Salt Range also called نمک کی کان in Urdu. These sites are popular tourist attractions and are known for their architectural and cultural significance.
- Kharian Cantt is home to a number of sports facilities, including cricket grounds, football pitches, and tennis courts. The town is known for its strong sporting traditions and has produced a number of talented athletes.
- The town is home to a number of religious sites, including mosques, temples, and churches.
- Kharian Cantt is located near a number of natural attractions, including the Tilla Jogian mountain range. These sites are popular destinations for hiking, picnicking, and other outdoor activities.
- The town is located in the province of Punjab, which is known for its rich cultural heritage and traditions. Punjab is home to a number of historical sites and landmarks, including the Lahore Fort and the Shalimar Gardens.
- Kharian Cantt is home to a number of healthcare facilities, including hospitals and clinics. The town is also home to a number of community centers and libraries, which offer a range of services and resources to the local community.
- Kharian Cantt is located near the famous Military College Jhelum (Sarai Alamgir).

== Geography ==
The Kharian Cantonment is 144 km from Islamabad and 173 km from Lahore. The cantonment lies almost midway between Lahore and Islamabad on Grand Trunk Road (GT Road). This is the road which connects the city all the way to India and Bangladesh, and Afghanistan on the other side. Prominent nearby cities and towns include Jhelum, Lalamusa, Dinga, Sarai Alamgir and Gujrat.

== Entrance ==
Kharian Cantonment is completely locked down for traffic except through the Checkposts controlled by Military Police (M.P). All the entering cars have to have a pass or permit; otherwise they can not enter the city. A temporary receipt can be obtained by scanning your ID Card at E-Gates. The Military Police Officer may ask you for your Driving Licence.

This cantonment is governed by Cantonment Board Kharian (CBK).

== Transport ==
Kharian Cantt is accessible by road on National Highway N-5 (known as the GT road) and the main Rail line. Not all express trains stop at the Kharian Cantt Railway station; public and private buses are the main means of transport. The main railway line passes in Kharian (Parent City) thus providing good transportation to the Northern and Southern part of Pakistan

Electric Shuttle Buses are operating inside the Cantonment but limited. Mostly peoples prefer to travel in Cab or Private Transports.

== Residential areas ==
Residential areas include the Abrar Colony, Sanaullah Colony, Ghazi Colony, Iftikhar Janjua Colony, Defence Colony, Shami Colony, North Colony, M-Block, Afzaal Colony, Gammon Colony and Johar Town. Besides, small camps and residential areas for military personnel are present. Each colony has a small park where typically you come across children playing cricket. In 2021, Cantonment Board elections were held throughout Pakistan including Kharian Cantonment.

== Health care ==
The cantonment has an "A" class standard, 700-bed teaching hospital known as CMH (Combined Military Hospital) Kharian. It is the second largest CMH after Rawalpindi.

CMH (Combines Military Hospital) has following facilities available for Civils/Non-Civils & Army:

- Children Complex
- AFNS Officer Mess
- Emergency/Trauma Center
- Eye Specialist
- Critical Care Unit (CCU)
- Cardiologist
- Dermatologist
- Specialists OPD

Many Pharmacies are available inside and nearby CMH for Medicines & Glasses.

== Education ==
Kharian Cantt offers education institutes for basic, intermediate, and higher education. Prominent schools and colleges include:

- F.G Degree College For Men
- F.G Degree College For Women
- F.G Boys Public School
- F.G Girls Public School
- F.G. Boys High School
- F.G Girls High School
- C.M.H Kharian Medical College
- Garrison Academy Kharian Cantt (GAK)
- Army Public School & College (APS&C)

In addition, good schools operate near the cantonment, including The Beaconhouse School Systems, International School of Cordoba, Bahria Foundation College, Dar-e-Arqam School and The City School (Pakistan). A famous Cadet College, Military College Jhelum, is located 15 km away at Sarai Alamgir.

== See also ==
- List of cities in Pakistan
- List of cities in Punjab (Pakistan)
- Army Cantonment Board
- Cantonment
