= Rabat, Lower Dir =

Rabat
- Union Council
- Country: Pakistan
- Province: Khyber Pakhtunkhwa
- District: Lower Dir
- Time zone: UTC+5 (PST)

Rabat is a union council of Lower Dir District in Khyber Pakhtunkhwa, Pakistan. It is located 15 km away from the district headquarter, Timergara.

Lower Dir District has 37 union councils with a population of 797,852, according to the 1998 census report. The population growth rate of the Lower Dir District was 3.42% per annum between the 1981 and 1998 censuses.

== History ==
Historically the ruling class remained with Khans of Rabat (1691 - 1969), who ruled the area in the Khanism Era and then in alliance under Nawabism with Nawab of Dir) for centuries.

The Khanism started in Rabat in 1691 when Muhammad Khan, son of Yasin Khan, was declared the First Khan of Rabat. in the Era of khanism after break of Pakhtunkhwa state which was controlled by Yousafzai Chieftaincy since 1535. Later, the Rabat khanate merged with Dur state under the rule of Nawab Muhammad Sharif khan. Khan Abdullah khan emerged as an influential figure due to his campaigns against Khan of Khar. This campaign was led by his elder son Khan Andre Rehman khan (Haji khan) and Sartor Faqir. At Samar Bagh (formerly Barwa), the Khan led a pushback against Faqir’s arsenals beyond Adenzai.

== See also ==
- Lower Dir District
