= M-11 motorway (Pakistan) =

Motorway in Pakistan

Coordinates: 32°18′09″N 74°23′49″E

M-11 motorway
- ایم ١١ موٹروے
- Lahore-Sialkot Motorway

Route information
- Maintained by National Highway Authority
- Length: 103 km (64 mi)
- Existed: 2018–present

Major junctions
- South end: Lahore Ring Road
- via Lahore bypass: Kala Shah Kaku; LSI Interchange via Gujranwala Expressway: Gujranwala
- North end: Sambrial

Location
- Country: Pakistan

Highway system
- Roads in Pakistan

The (M-11) or the Lahore–Sialkot Motorway is a north-south motorway which connects Sialkot and Lahore in Punjab, Pakistan. The 103 km (64 mi) long motorway, which cost 44 billion rupees, opened to traffic on 18 March 2020. It has reduced the travel time between Sialkot and Lahore to just 50 minutes instead of the alternative route via N-5 comprising 145 km and taking more than 2 hours. This new road connects the Sialkot and Lahore Airport junctions with an express travel mode of 1 hour, and would uplift the Sialkot city and the surrounding rural hinterlands. The motorway is maintained by the National Highway Authority.

== Route ==
The M-11 motorway is a 4-lane motorway, having 9 interchanges, 8 flyovers, 20 bridges and 18 x - underpasses as well as 12 subways, 23 cattle creeps & 207 culverts. Three industrial zones, one service area for each lane and two universities would also be established along with the project. It is linked with M2 and N5 through the Lahore Ring Road near Kala Shah Kaku. The route runs parallel to GT Road, passing east of Kamoki, Gujranwala, Daska, Kotli Kuppa and ending at Sambrial. At Sambrial, the M-11 end and the under-construction M- 12 motorway will start. Each service area has bathrooms a fuel station (PSO) and some shops. People who are coming from Sialkot will see their service area named Ravi service area as they are heading towards the river Ravi. People who are coming from Lahore will see their service area named Chenab service area as they are going towards the river Chenab. The Chenab service area is newer and bigger. Due to the M-12 not being operational yet, the M-11 terminates at Sialkot-Sambrial road. The motorway is also heavily used by people in Gujrat.

== History ==
The M-11 was originally conceived by the Ex-Chief Minister of Punjab, Choudhary Pervaiz Elahi. In 2006 and its foundation stone was laid in 2007 by the ex-President of Pakistan, General Pervez Musharraf. Its land was acquired but no actual construction work was started. According to the original plan, the M-11 would have been opened to the public in 2008 at the cost of 18 billion rupees PKR but the Government of Punjab shelved the project due to political reasons. Later the Ex-Prime Minister of Pakistan, Imran Khan, re-ordered construction of the M-11. The National Highway Authority (NHA) shortlisted only two companies — Frontier Works Organization(FWO) and a foreign firm for undertaking this project.M-11 runs parallel to M-2 from Lahore to Islamabad. The next phase, the M-12 from Sialkot to Kharian (via Gujrat), is under construction, and the final phase, the M-13, will be Kharian to Rawalpindi. It is linked to M2 Motorway via Rawalpindi Ring road. LSM was originally designed to be a six lane motorway but it was built as a four lane motorway. On August 15 M-TAG was installed on the toll plaza at the northern end of the motorway and all vehicles had to use M-TAG as the only form of payment. However, at the southern Toll Plaza M-TAG was not installed at the same time. M-TAG refilling stations were installed on both Toll Plazas with an offer for a free account for a few days. The motorway was completed and opened for traffic at March 18, 2020. The motorway is also prone to small closures usually because of fog. Such as of March 2025 the motorway closed due to fog but reopened later.

== Auxiliary Routes ==
The M-11 has one auxiliary route, which is the Gujranwala Expressway.

== Interchanges & Exits ==
Sialkot-Lahore Motorway
Interchange	Interchange	West bound exits	East bound exits
Mehmood Booti Interchange	Exit	Start of bypass	Start of L-20 (Ring Road)
Mehmood Booti Interchange	Exit	Kala Shah Kaku	Mehmood Booti
Shahdara Interchange	Exit	Shahdara & N-5	Kala Khatai & Narang Mandi
Lahore Bypass Junction	Exit	M-2 & N-5	–
Lahore Bypass Junction	Exit	Start / End of motorway	
Muridke Narowal Interchange		Muridke	Narowal
Wahndo Interchange		Eminabad	Wahndo
Wahndo Interchange		Gujranwala Expressway	Wahndo
Pasrur Interchange		Gujranwala	Wadala Sandhuan & Pasrur
Daska Pasrur Interchange		Daska	Dhidowali Sahi & Pasrur
Daska Sialkot Interchange		Daska	Sialkot
Sialkot Interchange		Wazirabad	Sialkot
Sialkot Interchange		Road continues as M-12 to Kharian	Start of M-11

== See also ==
- Motorways of Pakistan
- National Highways of Pakistan
- Transport in Pakistan
- National Highway Authority
