= Guliana, Gujrat =

Guliana گلیانہ
- Town
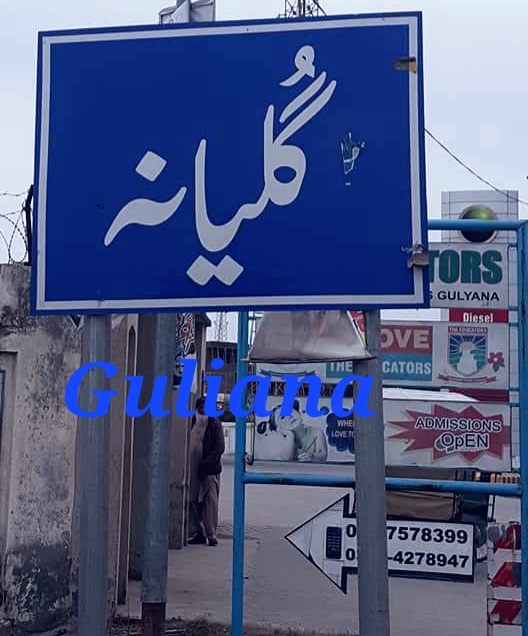
- Interactive map of Guliana
- Coordinates: 32°48′0″N 73°58′0″E
- Country: Pakistan
- Province: Punjab
- Division: Gujrat
- District: Gujrat
- Tehsil: Kharian
- Thana: Guliana
- Demonym: Gulyanvi
- Highways: N-5; M-12

Guliana, also spelt Galiana and Gulyana, is a town and union council of Gujrat District in the Punjab province of Pakistan. It is located at 32°48'0″N 73°58'0″E, at an altitude of 270 metres (890 ft).

Guliana is a very old village, now a town in the area. The village is mainly Gujjar dominant amounting to 70% of the population by caste Hashmi/Qureshi constitute the majority of the remaining 30%. It used to be a famous business route during pre-partition era (before 1947 AD) for surrounding villages and towns and for Kashmir. It is located on roads from Kharian and Lalamusa towards Bhimber via Kolta Arab Ali Khan and to Manglia.

Surrounding villages, Dhal Ghair, Dhal Kakka and Chak Kamal to the west, Bhagwal, Dham Jand Sharif, and Chak Bakhtawar to the north, Kotli Bajar to the east, and Chechian and Bhangwala to the west.

Notable people from this village include:-

- Suri Sehgal, Indian-American crop scientist, born in Guliana in 1934.
