= Jhantla =

Jhantla جھانٹلہ
- Village
- Location within Pakistan
- Coordinates: 32°50′46″N 73°57′50″E
- Country: Pakistan
- Province: Punjab
- Division: Gujrat
- District: Gujrat
- Tehsil: Kharian
- Thana: Guliana
- Time zone: UTC+5 (PST)
- Calling code: +92-53

Jhantla (IPA: [d͡ʒʱɑːnʈlɑː]) (Urdu: جھانٹلہ) is a village located in Kharian Tehsil, Gujrat District, in the Punjab province of Pakistan. It is approximately 150 kilometers from Lahore, the provincial capital of Punjab, and 17 kilometers from Kharian city.

Jhantla is classified as a "populated place" by regional mapping standards.

== Geography ==
Jhantla is located in the central plains of Punjab, near major road networks that connect it to the nearby cities such as Gujrat, Lalamusa, and Kharian. The surrounding areas are predominantly covered with fields of wheat, rice, and sugarcane, reflecting the largely agrarian lifestyle of its inhabitants.

The time zone in Jhantla is Asia/Karachi (UTC/GMT+5), consistent with the rest of Pakistan. The village does not observe Daylight Saving Time (DST).

== History and culture ==
Jhantla's history is linked to the agricultural economy of the Punjab region. The village maintains Punjabi customs, language, and festivals such as local folk music, bazaars, and annual celebrations during Eid.

Punjabi and Urdu are the primary languages spoken, while English is used for official and educational purposes.

== Demographics ==
Jhantla has a population of 1,360 as of 2017. The village is home to families who contribute to the local economy primarily through agriculture, small-scale trade, and remittances from overseas Pakistanis. The literacy rate in the region has been improving due to better access to educational facilities in nearby towns such as Kharian and Lalamusa.

== Accessibility and infrastructure ==
Jhantla is connected to the main transportation networks via roads leading to Kharian and Gujrat. The nearest railway station is in Lalamusa, which connects the village to Pakistan's broader rail system. Kharian Cant, a major cantonment area, is also located nearby.

The village has access to basic utilities, including electricity, mobile network coverage, and internet connectivity, although some areas may experience intermittent supply. Local schools and mosques form the community infrastructure.

== Climate ==
The climate of Jhantla is typical of the Punjab region, with long, hot summers and short and mild winters. The average annual temperature ranges between 25 °C (77 °F) and 30 °C (86 °F), with June and July being the hottest months. The village experiences monsoon rains during the summer, which are important for its agriculture.
