= Mandi Bahauddin Tehsil =

Mandi Bahauddin Tehsil تحصیل منڈی بہاء الدین
- Tehsil
- Tehsil Municipal Administration logo

- Location in Pakistan
- Coordinates: 32°26′N 73°35′E
- Country: Pakistan
- Region: (Punjab, Pakistan) Punjab
- District: Mandi Bahauddin
- Capital: Mandi Bahauddin

Population (2017)
  - Tehsil: 668,007
  - Urban: 217,207
  - Rural: 450,800
- Time zone: UTC+5 (PST)
  - Summer (DST): UTC+6 (PDT)

Mandi Bahauddin (Urdu: تحصیل منڈی بہاء الدین) is a tehsil located in Mandi Bahauddin District, Punjab, Pakistan. The city of Mandi Bahauddin is the headquarters of the tehsil. The tehsil has a total population of 668,007, according to the 2017 census.

== Administration ==
The tehsil of Mandi Bahauddin is administratively subdivided into 28 union councils, five of which form the capital. The 28 union councils are:

- U.C. No.1 M.B.Din
- U.C. N0.2 M.B.Din
- U.C. No.3 M.B.Din
- U.C. No.4 M.B.Din
- U.C. N0.5.M.B.Din
- U.C. No.6 Ahla
- U.C. No.7 Mong
- U.C. No.8 Rasul
- U.C. No.9 Chillianwala
- U.C. 10 Mojianwala
- U.C. 11 Dhok Kasib
- U.C. 12 Murala
- U.C. 13 Chakbasawa
- U.C. 14 Wasu
- U.C. 15 Shaheedanwali
- U.C. 16 Pindi Bahauddin
- U.C. 17 Sahna
- U.C. 18 Chhimmon
- U.C. 19 Sohawa Bulani
- U.C. 20 Sohawa Dillowana
- U.C. 21 Mangat
- U.C. 22 Kadhar
- U.C. 23 Mianwal Ranjha
- U.C. 24 Nain Ranjha
- U.C. 25 Kuthiala Sheikhan
- U.C. 26 Chak No 40
- U.C. 27 Bhikhi
- U.C. 28 Chak Raib
