= Jaisak =

Jaisak جیسک
- Village in Mandi Bahauddin
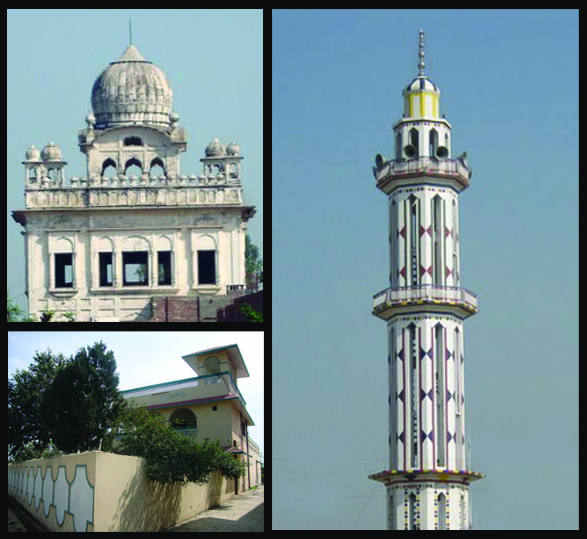
- Gurdawara Kair Sahib, Ghousia Minar, Awan House

- Location in Pakistan
- Coordinates: 32°31′02.0″N 73°36′25.2″E
- Country: Pakistan
- Region: Punjab
- District: Mandi Bahauddin
- Tehsil: Mandi Bahauddin
- Union Council: Chorund

Government
  - Type: Local Government

Population
  - Total: 5,000
- Approximately
- Time zone: UTC+5 (PST)
- Postal code: 50400
- Dialling code: 0546
- Website: http://jaisakmbdin.blogspot.com/

Jaisak is a village located in Mandi Bahauddin District in the Punjab province of Pakistan, Jaisak is situated 16 km east of the city of Mandi Bahauddin, 11 km north of the city of Phalia and 17.5 km south of the town of Chillianwala. Rasul-Qadir Abad Link Canal, a major water canal, flows near the village. The village was a significant Sikh settlement before 1947, hosting Gurdwara Kair Sahib as a central religious site.

Jaisak, previously known as Jaisukhwala (Jaisuk), has a rich historical background tied to the Sikhs and Partition of India and the Punjab region. The name "Jai Sukh Wala" is believed to derive from local linguistic or cultural origins, possibly indicating prosperity or peace ("Jai" meaning victory or glory, and "Sukh" meaning peace or happiness).

== Gurdwara Kair Sahib ==
Gurdwara Kair Sahib is a historic Sikh Gurdwara located in Jaisak Village. It commemorates the visit of Guru Nanak Dev Ji, the founder of Sikhism, and is a significant religious and historical site associated with his teachings. Built during the reign of Maharaja Ranjit Singh in the early 19th century, the gurdwara features a three-story structure and two sarovars (tanks), one designated for women. However, it is now in a critical state due to lack of refurbishment.

=== History ===
Gurdwara Kair Sahib was established to mark the visit of Guru Nanak Dev Ji during one of his missionary travels (udasis). According to local tradition and Sikh historical accounts, Guru Nanak arrived in Jai Sukh Wala on his way from Dinga and intervened when an angered mystic threatened to curse the villagers. Guru Nanak convinced the mystic that only God has the authority to punish, emphasizing Sikh principles of divine justice. This event is central to the gurdwara’s spiritual significance. Bhai Bhag, the grandson of the mystic, is said to have led a simple and fair life, and his grave is located near the gurdwara’s sarovar under a tree, adding to the site’s historical value.

The physical structure of Gurdwara Kair Sahib was constructed during the reign of Maharaja Ranjit Singh, a prominent Sikh ruler known as Sher-e-Punjab. The three-story building, along with two elegant tanks, was built to serve as a place of worship and pilgrimage. The gurdwara also included a Sarai (building) for pilgrims and was endowed with an estate of 40 squares of agricultural land and an annual income of 5,000 rupees, reflecting its importance during the Sikh Empire.

=== Architecture ===
Gurdwara Kair Sahib features a distinctive three-story building, characteristic of Sikh architecture during the Sikh Empire. It includes ornate designs, a central dome, and two sarovars (tanks) on its left side, one reserved for women. The gurdwara also had a sarai for accommodating pilgrims, though this is now occupied by local families.

=== Current Status ===
The Sikh population migrated to India in 1947, leaving Gurdwara Kair Sahib abandoned which is now occupied by local muslim families limiting public access. The structure remains standing but in a dilapidated state, though its historical presence still towers over the village. Approximately 100 families reside in the abandoned Gurdwara, also being occupied by a police officer who doesn't allow people to enter the site.

== Neighbouring Villages and Towns ==
Village Chorund 2 km and Ahdi Sharif 6.2 km to the west side of Jaisak, Helan 6 km to the east side, Qila Atar Singh 2 km and Phalia 11 km to the south side, Saharan 6.3 km, Murala 6.8 km and Chillianwala 17.5 km in the north, Mangat 13 km on the south side of Jaisak.

== Means Of Earning ==
The majority of young people are residing abroad to earn and support their families mainly in USA, Europe and Arab countries. There are some who are working as government employees and earn their livelihood through agriculture.

== Schools and colleges ==
The literacy rate is relatively high, almost every child goes to school. There are four schools in the village.

- Government primary school for boys
- Government middle school for girls
- Jinnah/Shahid Model Private School
- Ghazali English Private School

Approximately 500 students are studying in these schools.

== Mosques ==
The village is entirely Muslim population, home to six mosques.

- Ghousia Masjid (Jaamia) جامع غوثیہ مسجد
- Faizan-e-Madina Masjid فیضانِ مدینہ مسجد
- Ya Ali Masjid یا علی مسجد
- Madni Masjid (Jaamia) جامع مدنی مسجد
- Faisal Masjid فیصل مسجد
- Hazrat Bilal Masjid حضرت بلال مسجد

== Hospitals and Health Facilities ==
There is no hospital in the village, but one small clinic. The village has some health workers, creating awareness particularly about pregnancy and birth-related problems. Generally, people get minor health services from the town of Chorund and major services from Mandi Bahauddin or Phalia city.

== Shopping ==
There are no bazaars or markets in the village, but many general stores (Karyana shops) that provide commodities for daily use. People go to Mandi Bahauddin or Phalia city for major shopping.

== Transportation ==
The village is located almost 16 km southeast from the city Mandi Bahauddin. People travel on Vans from main Jaisak Chowk Bus Stop. Cars and Motorbikes are very common in the village.

== Main Crops ==
The land of the village is very fertile and many crops can be grown. Major crops include

- Wheat گندم
- Rice چاول
- Sugarcane گنا
- Potato آلو
- Sweet pea مٹر
- Chickpea چنا
- Barley جو
- Alfalfa لوسرن
- Sorghum جوار
- Maize مکئی
- Tobacco تمباکو
- Trifolium alexandrinum برسیم

== Media and Communication ==
TV and Mobile phones are present in almost every house. People in the village also possess Computers and use the 4G Internet. Telenor Pakistan is the largest telecommunications provider and has a tower in the village.

== Canal ==
There is one very famous canal Rasul-Qadir Abad Link Canal near the village.
