= Chak No. 1 =

- Village
- Location in Pakistan
- Coordinates: 32°36′39″N 73°37′18″E
- Country: Pakistan
- Province: Punjab
- District: Mandi Bahauddin
- Established: Early 1900
- Time zone: UTC+5 (PST)
- Postal code: 50350
- Area code: +92-546

Chak No. 1 is a village in Mandi Bahauddin Tehsil, Mandi Bahauddin District, Punjab, Pakistan. The numerical in the village name derives from the railway station built near Chillianwala on the line connecting Lalamusa, Malakwal, and Sargodha.

Chilianwala was the site of an 1849 battle in the Second Anglo-Sikh War, ending without a clear victor but causing the British military to re-evaluate its ambitions in India.
