= Shaheedanwali =

Town in Punjab, Pakistan

Shaeedanwali شہیدانوالی
- Village and union council
- Location in Punjab Pakistan
- Coordinates: 32.613044°N 73.532095°E
- Country: Pakistan
- Province: Punjab
- Division: Gujrat
- District: Mandi Bahauddin
- Tehsil: Mandi Bahauddin

Shaheedanwali is a village and Union Council of Mandi Bahauddin District in the Punjab province of Pakistan. It is situated 04 km east of the district capital - Mandi Bahauddin, 4 km west of the town of Chillianwala.and 4 km south of the town of Mong. The population of Shaheedanwali is about 28,000.

Shaheedanwali is a well-cultivated area; the main crops are wheat, rice, sugar cane and vegetables. Most village residents are farmers and some government servants. A Govt. Boys primary school and Govt. Girls primary was established. Govt. Girls primary has been converted into a high school and Govt Boys Primary School into a middle school.
