= Chahrkey =

Village in Punjab, Pakistan

Chahrkey چاہڑکے
- Village
- Location in Pakistan
- Coordinates: 32°25′09″N 73°49′59″E
- Country: Pakistan
- Province: Punjab
- Division: Gujrat
- District: Mandi Bahauddin
- Tehsil: Phalia

Chahrkey (also spelled as Chaharke, or Chaharki) is a village located at Latitude 32°25'8.08 Longitude: 73°50'4.35 in tehsil Phalia, Mandi Bahauddin District, Punjab, Pakistan. It is situated on the bank of Chenab River. Its estimated terrain elevation above sea level is 219 metres. The nearest towns are Jokalian, Khoosar, Narang, Kamonkey, Ratti Pindi and Saad Ullah Pur. On the other bank of Chenab River, Ali Pur Chatta and Rasulnagar are situated. The earlier name of Rasulnagar was Ramnagar. Chahrkey is full of lush green fields. In 1973, the village almost drowned in a flood and then the government built a flood safety wall on its south side to save the population of numerous villages, in future. Qadirabad Headworks is situated 6 km west of Chahrkey on Chenab River. A battle fought on 22 November 1848 in nearby towns of Saad Ullah Pur and Ramnagar between British Army and Khalsa Sikh . Chahrkey is included in the Punjab Provincial Assembly constituency PP-117. The earlier name of this constituency was PP-99 and it was changed in the 2008 elections.

== Ways of earning ==
Most of the population of the village depends upon agricultural earnings. The soil of the village is very fertile. The people love to have the cattle for their needs. Some of the people are working in Education, Health, Judiciary, Army, Police and Civil Engineering departments. A considerable community is working abroad to earn for their families. Some people have earned a good name in the business of rice, furniture and pottery.

== Tribes and Castes ==
Most of the population of the village belongs to Dhothar, Jatts, Janjua, Tarar, Mangat, Malhi castes.

== Crops ==
The main crops of the village are Sugarcane, (جوار), Rice, Wheat, Millet (باجرا), Peanut (مونگ پھلی), Maiz, Water Mellon, Mellon and orchards of mangoes, banana and date palms.

== Jungle on river side ==
A small jungle (Baila) on the bank of Chenab river / River Chenab touches the Qadirabad Headworks and beatifies the environment. The overall atmosphere is totally pollution free and the atmosphere remains very pleasant during summer but cool during winter. The small jungle remains full of pheasants, birds, monkeys and a few pigs. The small sized but very dangerous snakes are often seen at riverside.

== Schools ==
- Government Girls Middle School Chahrkey
- Government Boys Middle School Chahrkey

== Community Centre ==
A graceful Community Centre (Daara) is available in west side of the village where wedding and death ceremonies and other gatherings are arranged. In today's world, neither the custom of singing songs, Heer, Tappay and Mahiaya is available nor the people bother to gather around the fire in winter nights.
