= Mandi Bahauddin (disambiguation) =

Mandi Bahauddin is a city in central north Punjab, Pakistan.

Mandi Bahauddin may also refer to:

- Mandi Bahauddin District, a district of Punjab, Pakistan
- Mandi Bahauddin Tehsil, a tehsil of district Mandi Bahauddin
- Mandi Bahauddin railway station, a railway station in Pakistan

== See also ==
- Mandi (disambiguation)
