= Chak Jano Kalan =

Chak Jano Kalan چک جانو کلاں
- Village and Union Council
- Location in Pakistan
- Coordinates: 32°27′N 73°43′E
- Country: Pakistan
- Region: Punjab
- District: Mandi Bahauddin
- Tehsil: Phalia
- Time zone: UTC+5 (PST)

Chak Jano Kalan is a village and union council of Phalia Tehsil, Mandi Bahauddin District, Punjab, Pakistan. Chak Jano Kalan is located at 32°27'0N 73°43'0E at an altitude of 216 metres (711 feet). It lies about 34 km south-east of Mandi Bahauddin city (the district capital) on the Gujrat-Sargodha Road. The nearest police station is Pharianwali Police Station, which is 3 km to the east. Chak Jano is divided into three branches, Chak Jano Kalan, Nai Abadi and Chak Jano Khurd. The combined population of Chak Jano is 15,000. About 40% of the population comprises farmers, 40% work as labourers, 15% work overseas, and other 5% work in commercial and industrial enterprises.
