= Chak Mitha =

Village in Punjab Province, Pakistan

Coordinates: 32°26′30″N 73°49′30″E

Chak Mitha (چک مٹھا) is a village of Phalia Tehsil, Mandi Bahauddin District, Punjab Province, Pakistan. The village is situated on the main road linking Mandi Bahauddin and Phalia.
