= Ghagoki =

- Village
- Ghagoki
- Location in Pakistan
- Coordinates: 32°29′0″N 73°47′0″E
- Country: Pakistan
- Region: Punjab
- District: Mandi Bahauddin
- Tehsil: Phalia

Government

Population
  - Total: 2,497
- Time zone: UTC+5 (PST)
  - Summer (DST): UTC+6 (PDT)
- Area code: 0546

Ghagoki (Punjabi and Urdu: گھگوکی) is a small village in Phalia Tehsil of Mandi Bahauddin District, Punjab, Pakistan. It has a population of 2,500.

Ghagoki is located in Phalia Tehsil of the district, with the Ravi River flowing nearby.
