= Madhray =

Madhray مدھرے
- Village
- Location in Pakistan
- Coordinates: 32°28′N 73°30′E
- Country: Pakistan
- Region: Punjab
- District: Mandi Bahauddin District
- Tehsil: Phalia
- Time zone: UTC+5 (PST)
- General Post Office: 40500
- Area code: 0456

Madhray ( مدھرے) is a small village near Phalia city of Mandi Bahauddin District, Punjab, Pakistan. The village is located between the area's main cities of Mandi Bahauddin and Phalia, about 18 km from Mandi Bahauddin, 7 km from Phalia, 45 km from Malakwal and about 80 km from Salam interchange on the M2 motorway, at an altitude of 715 feet (218 m) above sea level.

Government Islamia Millet High School for Boys, established in early 1970s, is a famous progressive school in Madhray. The village also hosts the Government High School for Girls.

This village has a moderate climate, hot in summer and cold in winter. During peak summer, the temperature rises up to 44 °C (111 °F). The winter months are mild and the minimum temperature may fall below −2 °C (28 °F).
