= Kakowal =

Human settlement in Pakistan

Coordinates: 32°31′0″N 73°26′0″E

Dera haji bati khan Gondal is a village of Mandi Bahauddin District in the Punjab province of Pakistan. It is located at and has an altitude of 252 metres (827 ft). Neighbouring settlements include Bhikhi and Wasu. Dera Haji bati khan Gondal is a small countryside containing the population of about 2000 people.

Haji bati kha n Gondal/Dera hajibati kha n Gondal/==References==
