= Kadhar =

- Village and Union Council
- Location in Pakistan
- Coordinates: 32°34′47″N 73°28′53″E
- Country: Pakistan
- Region: Punjab
- District: Mandi Bahauddin
- Tehsil: Mandi Bahauddin
- Time zone: UTC+5 (PST)

Kadhar is a famous village and union council of Mandi Bahauddin District in the Punjab Province of Pakistan. It lies about 8 km from Phalia on the western side. Kadhar is considered a hub of education in the region due to its highly educated population and numerous institutions, which include two Government High Schools for Boys, one Government High School for Girls, and one College for Girls. Other local facilities include a Rural Health Centre, a union council office, and a bank.

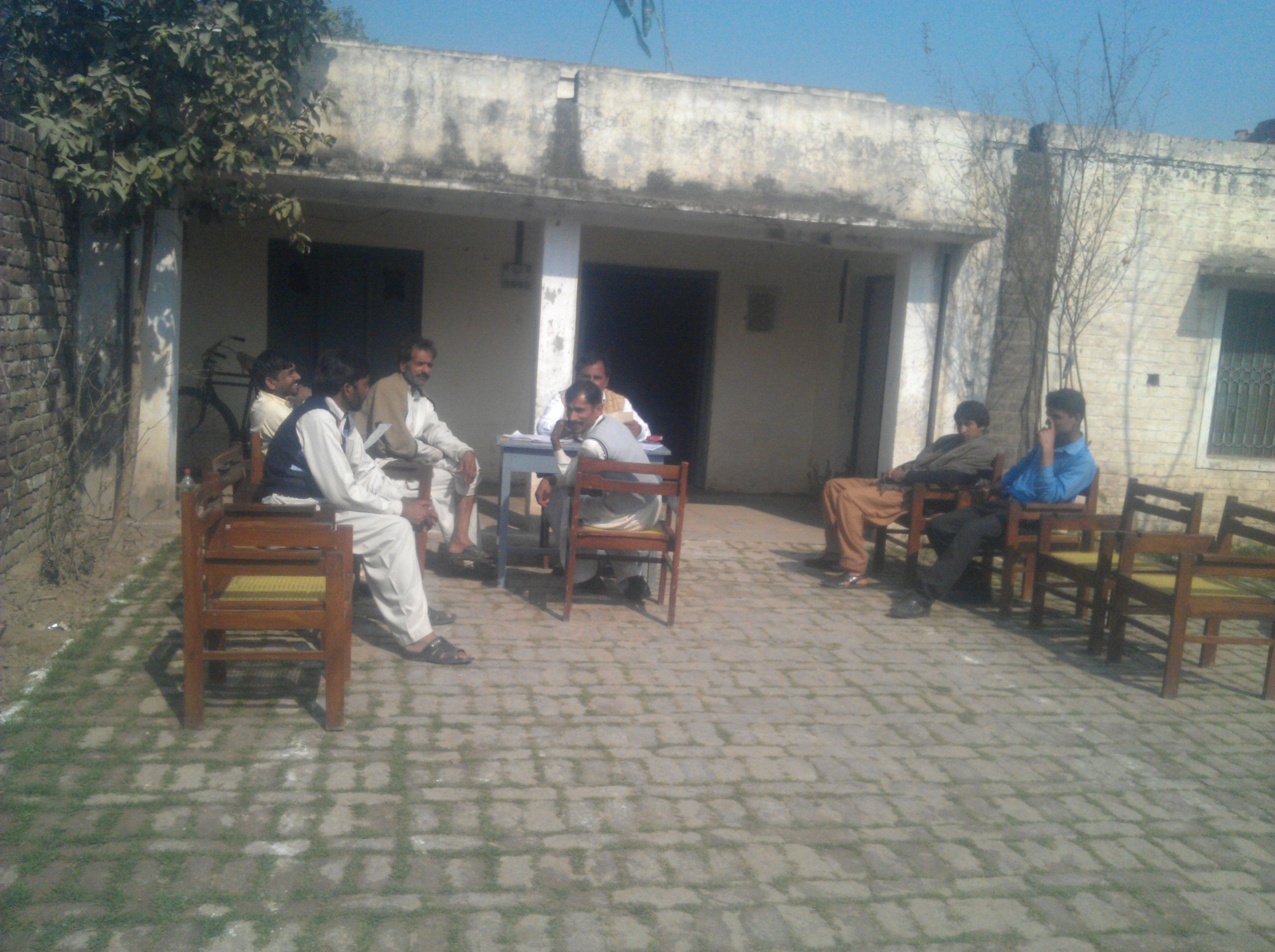
Inner view of union council

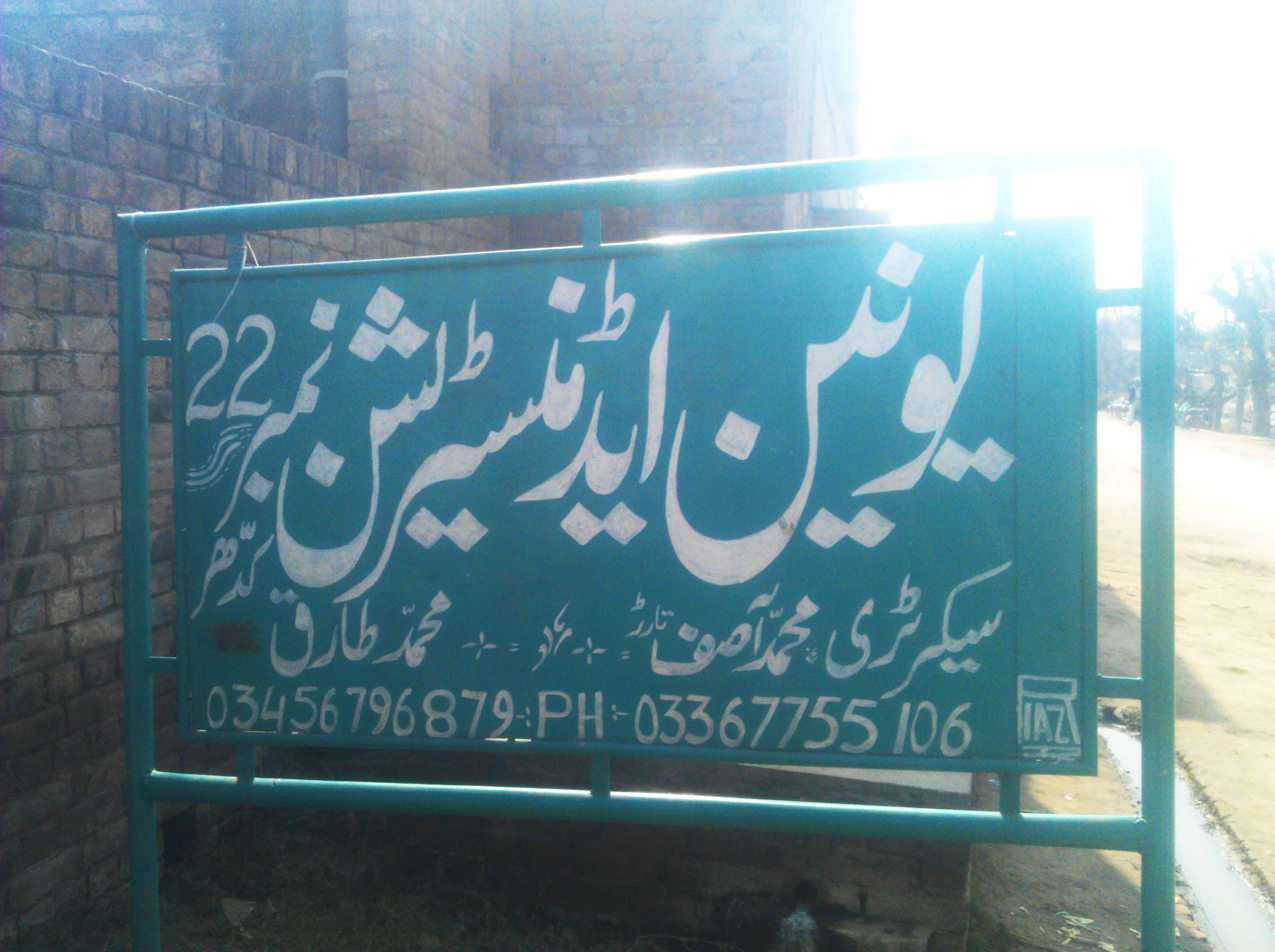
Union Council (UC22) sign board
