= Nain =

Nain may refer to:

== Places ==
- Nain, Iran, a city in Iran
- Nain County, an administrative subdivision of Iran
- Nain, Israel, a village in Galilee, mentioned in the New Testament (miraculous raising of the son of the widow of Nain)
- Nain, Jamaica, a village in the parish of Saint Elizabeth
- Nain, Newfoundland and Labrador, a village on the central coast of Labrador, Canada
- Nain Province, a geologic province in Labrador, Canada, part of the North Atlantic Craton
- Nain, Punjab, a village and Union Council of Pakistan
- Nain, South Australia, in the northern Barossa Valley
- Nain, Virginia, an unincorporated community in Frederick County, Virginia, United States
- Nain, Principality of Hutt River, capital and only town in the self-proclaimed state
- Nain, Raebareli, a village in Uttar Pradesh, India

== Other uses ==
- Nain rug, name of a traditional pattern and design of Persian carpet
- Nain, assistant court ladies of Korea, see gungnyeo
- Nain, a character in Tolkien's middle earth fantasy novel The Hobbit: see List of The Hobbit characters
- Nain, a Welsh word for grandmother

== See also ==
- Nain Jaune, a traditional, still popular French family card game
