= Dhaul Ranjha =

Dhoul Ranjha دھول رانجھا
- Union Council
- Location in Pakistan
- Coordinates: 32°28′N 73°31′E
- Country: Pakistan
- Region: Punjab
- District: Mandi Bahauddin
- Tehsil: Phalia
- Time zone: UTC+5 (PST)
- Postal code: 40500
- Area code: 0546
- Website: Dhoul Ranjha

Dhoul Ranjha is a village and Union council of Phalia Tehsil in Mandi Bahauddin District of Punjab, Pakistan.

== Education ==
The basic facilities of education are available in village. The Government shahid munir shaeed High School for Boys is present in the village as well. As village also hosts Government High School for Girls. There are four Schools in the village.One primary School and the rest two are High Schools.
