= Dhok Nawan Lok =

- Town
- Location in Pakistan
- Coordinates: 32°34′55″N 73°38′05″E
- Country: Pakistan
- Province: Punjab
- District: Mandi Bahauddin
- Time zone: UTC+5 (PST)

Dhok Nawan Lok is a village in Mandi Bahauddin District, Punjab province of Pakistan. It is located 18 kilometers east of Mandi Bahauddin and 0.5 kilometers north of Dhok Kasib.

== Demographics ==
Dhok Nawan Lok has a population of around 5,000 with a literacy rate of 80%. The main caste in Dhok Nawan Lok is Sahi. The most common industries are agricultural and services-related. After 1995, most of the younger people of this town preferred to travel abroad as economic migrants, resulting in approximately 15% of the natives under 35 years of age now residing in Europe and North America.

The village previously experienced religiously-motivated violence, with records of gurdwaras having been burnt in 1942 as anti-Sikh violence occurred in surrounding areas. The electrification of the village was approved by the Minister for Fuel, Power, and Natural Resources in 1974.

== Economy ==
The migration of a large portion of the population changed the entire local economy; foreign exchange now accounts for around 90 percent of the total income of the town. This has resulted in higher prices for real estate and agricultural property. The price of 1-acre (4,000 m^{2}) of purely agricultural land has increased to around 800,000 Rs. Per acre non-agricultural properties in real estate have also risen to an estimated 3200,000 PK Rs (4,000 m^{2}). The village has approximately 1,500 acres (6.1 km^{2}) of land.
