= Sohawa Bolani =

Coordinates: 32°33′N 73°28′E

Sohawa is a town in Mandi Bahauddin District in Punjab, Pakistan. It is situated on Phalia Road, almost 3 km from the city of Mandi Bahauddin. The town basically consists of three villages: Sohawa Bolani, Sohawa Jamlani and Sohawa Dilloana and is divided into two Union Councils, Sohawa Bolani (Union Council 17) and Sohawa Dilloana (Union Council 18).
