= Government Peer Yaqoob Shah Degree College Phalia =

School in Phalia, Pakistan

PYS Degree College Phalia
- Military College Jhelum Monogram
- Motto: Faith, Unity, Discipline
- Type: Post Graduate College
- Established: 3 March 1962
- Faculty: 50
- Students: ~550
- Location: Phalia, Punjab, Pakistan
- Campus: 50 acres (0.20 km^{2})
- Colors: Red & White
- Mascot: Alamgirians

Peer Yaqoob Shah Degree College Phalia established formerly at Intermediate level for boys students in the year 1962. Primarily the classes started in the premises of Govt Pilot Secondary School Phalia. On completing its building the college moved there. In the decade of 90s the college upgraded to degree level and to post graduate level after 2000. The college is affiliated with University of the Punjab, Lahore, Pakistan. It is situated 2 km away from the heart of the Phalia City on Kuthiala Sheikhan road. The courses of Sciences, Arts, Computer Sciences (B.A),(B.Sc) are offered in the college. Almost 500 students annually study in the various courses. The college own a hostel within its premises. A library is available to the students and the teaching faculty. Government of Punjab provides maximum books. In 1997, the nomenclature of the college changed from Government College Phalia to Government Peer Yaqqob Shah College Phalia admiring the services of Phalia's papular Islamic scholar and former Member of Provincial Assembly of the Punjab Peer Yaqoob Shah (late). There are big playgrounds within the premises of the college! The college possesses reasonably good accommodations for its staff.

== See also ==
- Phalia
- Govt Pilot Secondary School Phalia
- Govt Islamia Secondary School Phalia
