= Ghaniaan =

- Town and Union Council
- Location in Pakistan
- Coordinates: 32°23′N 73°39′E
- Country: Pakistan
- Region: Punjab
- District: Mandi Bahauddin District
- Tehsil: Phalia Tehsil
- Villages: 16

Population
  - Total: 12,000
- Time zone: UTC+5 (PST)
- General Post Office (GPOs): 50431
- Area code: 0546

Ghaniaan is a village and Union council of Phalia Tehsil, Mandi Bahauddin District, Punjab, Pakistan. It is located at N 32°40'29 & E 73°64'96 with an altitude of 201 metres above sea level and lies about 8 km north-west of Phalia on the Phalia-Alipur Chatha road near Chenab River Qadirabad Headworks. The nearest police station is Phalia Police Station, which is about 7.5 km to the northwest. The population of the village is about 12,000.

== Overview ==
Ghaniaan has all basic facilities including a hospital, schools, telephones and good roads with transport to the nearest city Phalia. Most of the people are farmers by profession; but, in a few years, a number of people have found employment in European and Gulf countries, which has raised people's lifestyle. There are two main crops, rice and wheat. Local farmers earn good money from 'Colonel Basmati' brand rice. The literacy rate is also going up, especially among women. The people from Ghaniaan like many others have contributed their part at the international level in the fields of engineering and medicine, etc.

== Geography ==
The coordinate are N 32°40'29 & E 73°64'96. With an altitude of 201 metres above sea level and lies about 8 km North West of Phalia on the Phalia-Alipur Chatha road near Chenab River Qadirabad Headworks.ٹوٹل زرعی رقبہ 132 مربع

== Education ==
- Government boys High school (oldest school built in 1868)
- Government girls High school
- Government primary school Thatti Bawa
- Two NFBE schools
- 3 private schools
