= Qadirabad =

Residential town in Punjab, Pakistan

Qadirabad قادر آباد
- Village and union council
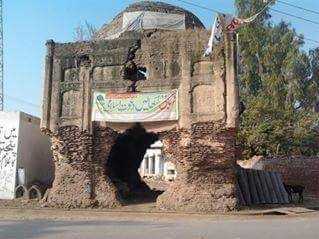
- Begum Qadir's tomb in Qadirabad

- Location within Pakistan Qadirabad (Pakistan)
- Coordinates: 32°17′51″N 73°30′07″E
- Country: Pakistan
- Region: Punjab
- District: Mandi Bahauddin
- Tehsil: Phalia

Government
  - Type: Provincial

Population (2017 Census of Pakistan)
  - Total: 91,821
- Time zone: PST

Qadirabad (Punjabi:قادرآباد) is a village near the Chenab River in Phalia Tehsil, Mandi Bahauddin District in Punjab, Pakistan.

== History ==
Qadirabad is named after Abdul Rafay, whose grave and that of his brother are located in the village. A wall with three gateways was built around the village between 1556 and 1605.

The predominantly Muslim population of the village supported the All-India Muslim League and the Pakistan Movement. After the independence in 1947, the minority Hindus and Sikhs migrated to India while Muslim refugees from India settled in the Mandi Bahauddin District.

== Demographics ==
As of the 2017 Census of Pakistan, the population of Qadirabad was 91,821.

== Geography ==
The Chenab River is approximately five kilometers south of Qadirabad. The closest cities are Phalia, about 20 kilometers away, Mandi Bahauddin about 40 kilometers away, and Gujrat about 70 kilometers away. Sialkot International Airport is about 115 km from Qadirabad. Sargodha is approximately 98 kilometers from Qadirabad via Bhalwal, and about 104 km via Sial Mor. Faisalabad is approximately 165 km via the M-3 motorway. Allama Iqbal International Airport in Lahore is approximately 210 km from Qadirabad via the motorway and approximately 180 km via Gujranwala. The Old Ravi bridge in Lahore is approximately 150 km from Qadirabad via Gujranwala and 185 km via the M-3 motorway. Islamabad International Airport is approximately 255 km via the Motorway, approximately 200 km via Mandi Bahauddin, and approximately 230 km via Gujrat. Hafizabad is about 65 km via Qadirabad Headworks.

== Transport ==
The nearest railway station is in Mandi Bahauddin. The closest international airports are in Lahore, Faisalabad, Sialkot and Islamabad, each about a three- to four-hour drive away.
