= Murala =

Murala Takhat Murala , Murala
- Village and union council
- Location in Pakistan
- Coordinates: 32°31′59″N 73°37′59″E
- Country: Pakistan
- Province: Punjab
- District: Mandi Bahauddin

Murala is a village and union council of Mandi Bahauddin District in the Punjab province of Pakistan. Murala is 23 km from Mandi Bahauddin in the east, 12 km from Phalia in the north, and 10 km from the town of Chailianwala in a southerly direction.

== Education ==
The village has basic educational facilities, Government High School for Boys and Government High School for Girls are both present in village.also have to many private schools
