= Jholana =

Village in Pakistan

Coordinates: 32.534°N 73.484°E

https://mbdin.com/jhulana/

Jholana is a village in Mandi Bahauddin District, Punjab, Pakistan.

The village has three government schools and 4 private schools.
