= Chakbasawa =

Coordinates: 32°34′30″N 73°33′30″E

Chak Basawa
- Village and union council
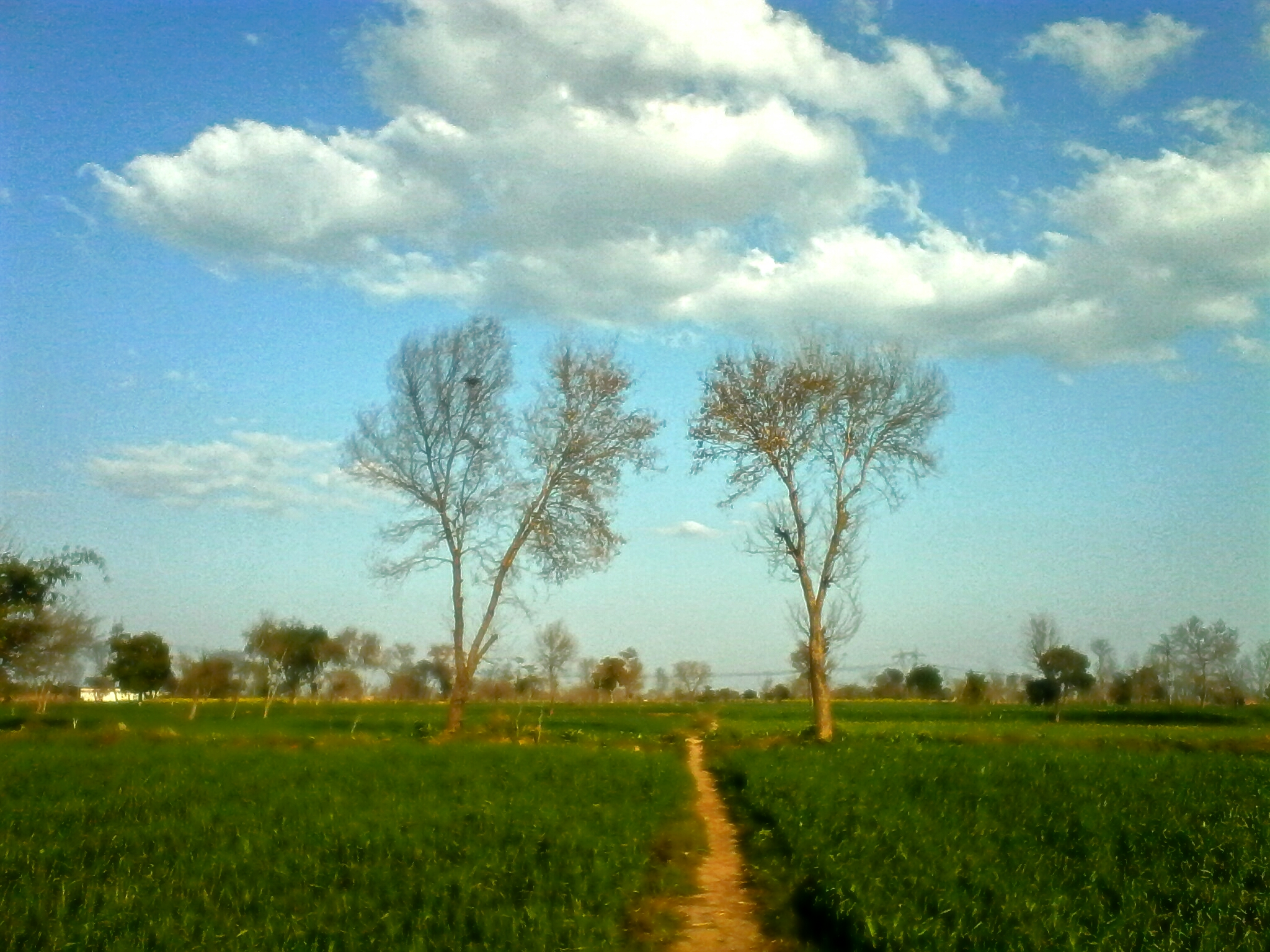
- Interactive map of Chak Basawa
- Country: Pakistan
- Province: Punjab
- District: Mandi Bahauddin
- Tehsil: Mandi Bahauddin
- Time zone: UTC+5 (PST)

Chak Basawa is a village and union council of Mandi Bahauddin District in the Punjab province of Pakistan. It is located at 32°34'30N 73°33'30E and has an altitude of 219 metres (721 feet).
