= Bhikhi =

Bhikhi may refer to:

- Bhikhi, Pakistan, a Union Council of Mandi Bahauddin District.
- Bhikhi, India, a nagar panchayat of Mansa district.
