= Mianwal Ranjha =

Coordinates: 31°53′0″N 73°6′0″E

Mianwal Ranjha میانوال رانجها
- Village and union council
- Interactive map of Mianwal Ranjha
- Country: Pakistan
- Region: Punjab
- District: Mandi Bahauddin District
- Established: Before 1900AD
- Time zone: UTC+5 (PST)

Mianwal Ranjha is a village and union council of Mandi Bahauddin District in the Punjab province of Pakistan. It is located at 31°52'60N 73°5'60E, at an altitude of 183 metres (603 feet). Mianwal Ranjha is among the larger villages of Mandi Bahauddin. Read More

Mianwal Ranjha is a historic village in Mandi Bahauddin Punjab. The majority of its people are affiliated with the agriculture sector. This village has historic religious background. Before 1300 AD two tribes Ranjha and Makhdoom came there and dominated this fertile peace of land. Later on many other Jutt tribes Gondal, Tarar, Warrich came there. Other non-cultivator tribes are also living there. The majority of this village is engaged with different professions like Law, medical, and education.
