= Dhok Kasib =

Dhok Kasib Wadda Lok Dhoka Sahiyan
- Village
- Dhok Kasib
- Location in Pakistan
- Coordinates: 32°34′47″N 73°28′53″E
- Country: Pakistan
- Province: Punjab
- District: Mandi Bahauddin
- Tehsil: Mandi Bahauddin
- Time zone: UTC+5 (PST)

Dhok Kasib is a village and Union Council of Mandi Bahauddin District in the Punjab province of Pakistan. Postal Code of Dhok Kasib is 50331.

== Education ==
The village contains the basic facilities of education and is home to Government Higher Secondary School for Boys and Government High Model School for Girls.

== See also ==
- Dhok Nawan Lok
