= Umrao Khurd =

Pakistani village

Umrao Khurd امراؤ خورد
- Village
- Location within Punjab, Pakistan
- Coordinates: 32°16′01.4″N 73°39′47.3″E
- Country: Pakistan
- Province: Punjab
- Division: Gujranwala
- District: Hafizabad

Area
  - Total: 5.7 ha (14 acres)
- Elevation: 207 m (679 ft)

Population
  - Total: 490
- Time zone: UTC+5 (PST)
- Calling code: 0547

Umrao Khurd (Urdu: امراؤ خورد) is a small village in the Hafizabad District of Punjab, Pakistan. It is located at 32°16′01.4″N 73°39′47.3″E with an altitude of 207 meters (679 feet).

It consists of approximately 80 homes and 490 people. Amrao Khurd is bounded by rivers and canals. The major canal that originates from the Chenab River at Qadirabad barrage is just east of the village, and the village is often threatened by floods.

== Education ==
Youth literacy rate in Amrao Khurd in high. There is one government primary school in village. Due to no secondary school students mainly go to schools in nearby villages. People who can afford for private schools mainly send their kids to M.H Sufi Foundation, which is located in nearby village of Ramke Chattha.
