= Pind Makko =

Pakistani village

- Village
- Location in Pakistan
- Coordinates: 32°26′N 73°35′E
- Country: Pakistan
- Province: Punjab
- District: Mandi Bahauddin
- Time zone: UTC+5 (PST)

Pind Makko is a village in the western part of Mandi Bahauddin District in Punjab, Pakistan. The village was originally known as Al-Haaj Wali Muhammad Mughal, but it was later renamed after a person named Makko, who owned the land. In English, "Pind" means village, so over time it became known as "Pind Makko." Located on the western boundary of Mandi Bahauddin District, Pind Makko is one of the larger villages in the surrounding area.

== Popularity ==
The village is popular because of its active participation in district politics. It is between Miana Gondal and Miani. A railway station is also present here. This station has been built by the local funds raised by people of the area. This railway station is used for the export of fruits and vegetables from the village to the markets of different cities. It has a phone exchange that provides the facility of communication to the nearby villages.

== Education ==
Basic facilities of education is present in village. Government High School for Boys is present in village and as well as for Girls

== Agriculture ==
The main agricultural products of the village include oranges, kinnows, wheat, rice and sugar cane.
