= Nain rug =

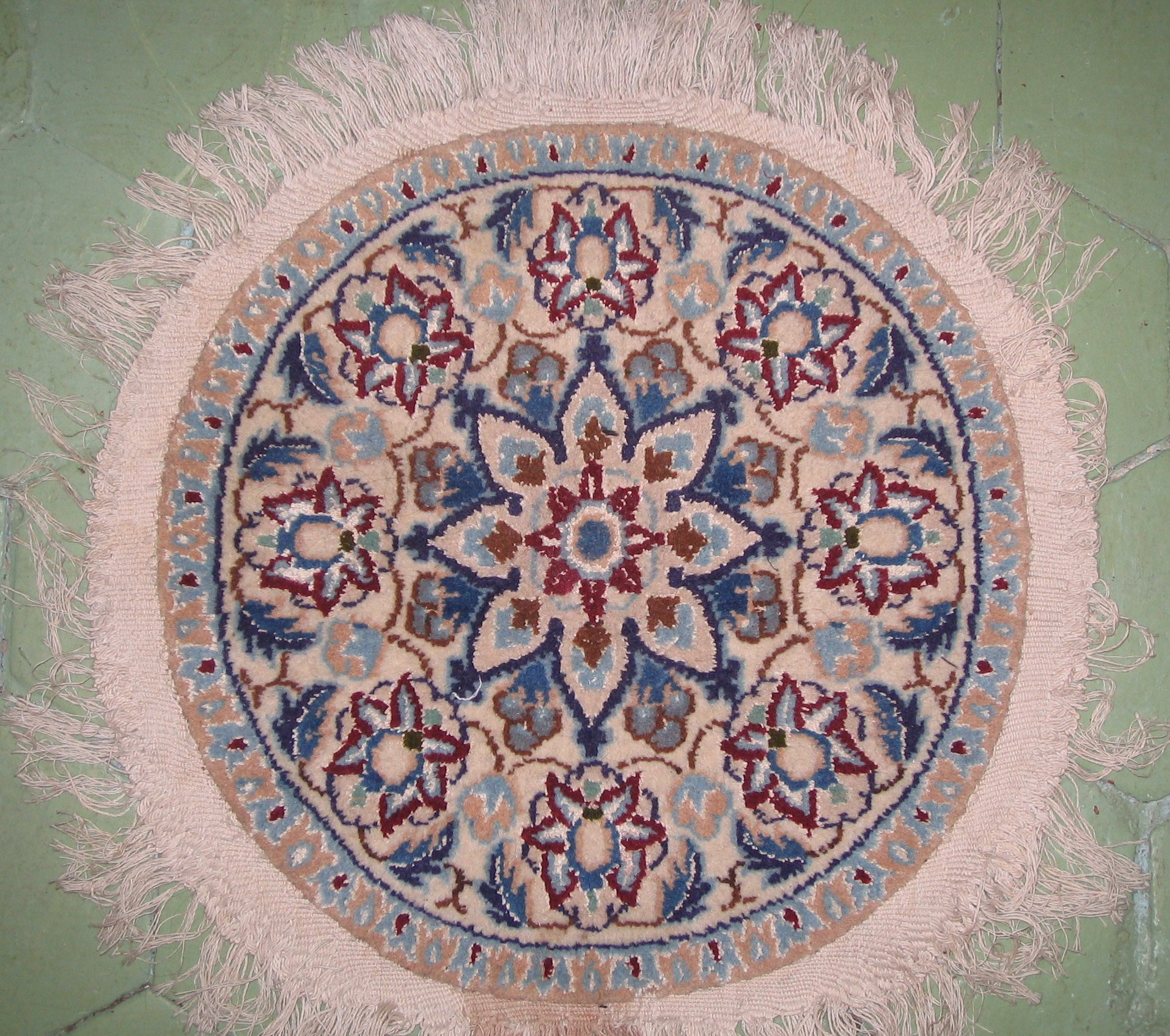
A round Nain rug

Nain rugs are produced in Nain, in central Iran, beginning shortly before World War II. They are constructed using the Persian knot, and typically have between 250 and 500 knots per square inch. The pile is wool, spun finer than most Persian wools, and the nap is short.

The design of Nain rugs is similar to Isfahan rugs, including the Shãh Abbãsi floral design. Other motifs include flowers, foliage, and vines.
