= Muhammad Khan Bhatti =

Pakistani civil servant

- محمد خان بھٹی

Secretary, Punjab Assembly
- Appointed by: Speaker, Punjab Assembly

Principal Secretary, Chief Minister of Punjab
- In office July 26, 2022 – January 22, 2023
- Appointed by: Chief Secretary, Punjab

Personal details
- Born: April 12, 1968 (age 57) Mandi Bahauddin, Pakistan
- Children: Sheheryar Bhatti
- Occupation: Civil servant, Punjab Assembly

Muhammad Khan Bhatti (Urdu: محمد خان بھٹی; born 12 April 1968) is a Pakistani civil servant who serves in BPS-22 grade as the Secretary, Punjab Assembly.

== Early life and family ==
Muhammad Khan Bhatti was born to Sher Muhammad Bhatti in Farrukhpur Bhattian, Mandi Bahauddin on April 12, 1968. He has two brothers, Baqir Khan Bhatti and Ahmed Khan Bhatti. His nephew Sajid Ahmed Khan Bhatti remained Member of Provincial Assembly of the Punjab from Mandi Bahauddin.

== Career ==
He joined government service as a grade- 5 clerk in Agriculture Department, Punjab in 1988. In 1996, he was inducted into Punjab Assembly in grade-11. He got rapid promotions and attained grade-19 within a short span. In 2002, when Chaudhry Pervaiz Elahi became Chief Minister of Punjab, he was appointed as Additional Secretary to Chief Minister on Political Affairs. He also served as Additional Secretary and Special Secretary in Chief Minister's Secretariat during Pervaiz Elahi's stint as Chief Minister of Punjab. On March 8, 2008, he was promoted and posted as Secretary, Punjab Assembly.

During PML-N's government in province of Punjab from 2008 to 2018, he was dismissed from service but Lahore High Court reinstated him. He was posted on deputation as Principal Secretary to Chief Minister of Punjab on July 26, 2022. He was transferred to Punjab Assembly on January 22, 2023.
