= Nain Ranjha =

Coordinates: 32°22′0″N 73°23′0″E

- Town and union council
- Interactive map of Nain Ranjha
- Country: Pakistan
- Province: Punjab
- District: Mandi Bahauddin
- Tehsil: Mandi Bahauddin
- Time zone: UTC+5 (PST)
- Postal code: 50491
- Area code: 0546

Nain Ranjha is a village and union council of Mandi Bahauddin District in the Punjab province of Pakistan. It is located at an altitude of 201 metres (662 feet).
