= Sahna =

Village in Punjab, Pakistan

Coordinates: 32°33′0″N 73°21′0″E

- Village and union council
- Interactive map of Sahna
- Country: Pakistan
- Province: Punjab
- District: Mandi Bahauddin

Government
- Time zone: UTC+5 (PST)

Sahna is a village and union council of Mandi Bahauddin District, in Punjab, Pakistan. Situated at an elevation of 211 meters (695 feet), it holds geographical and administrative significance in the region.
