= Ahla, Pakistan =

Ahla
- Village and Union council
- Location in Pakistan
- Coordinates: 32°36′N 73°24′E
- Country: Pakistan
- Province: Punjab
- District: Mandi Bahauddin
- Time zone: UTC+5 (PST)

Ahla is a village and union council of Mandi Bahauddin District in the Punjab province of Pakistan. Ahla is situated on the southern bank of Lower Jhelum Canal, about 9 km from Mandi Bahauddin city. It is located at an altitude of 202 metres (666 ft) above sea level. Ahla is the headquarters of union council Ahla. It has a railway station, located some 3 km from the village.
