= Shãh Abbãsi floral design =

Iranian floral motif

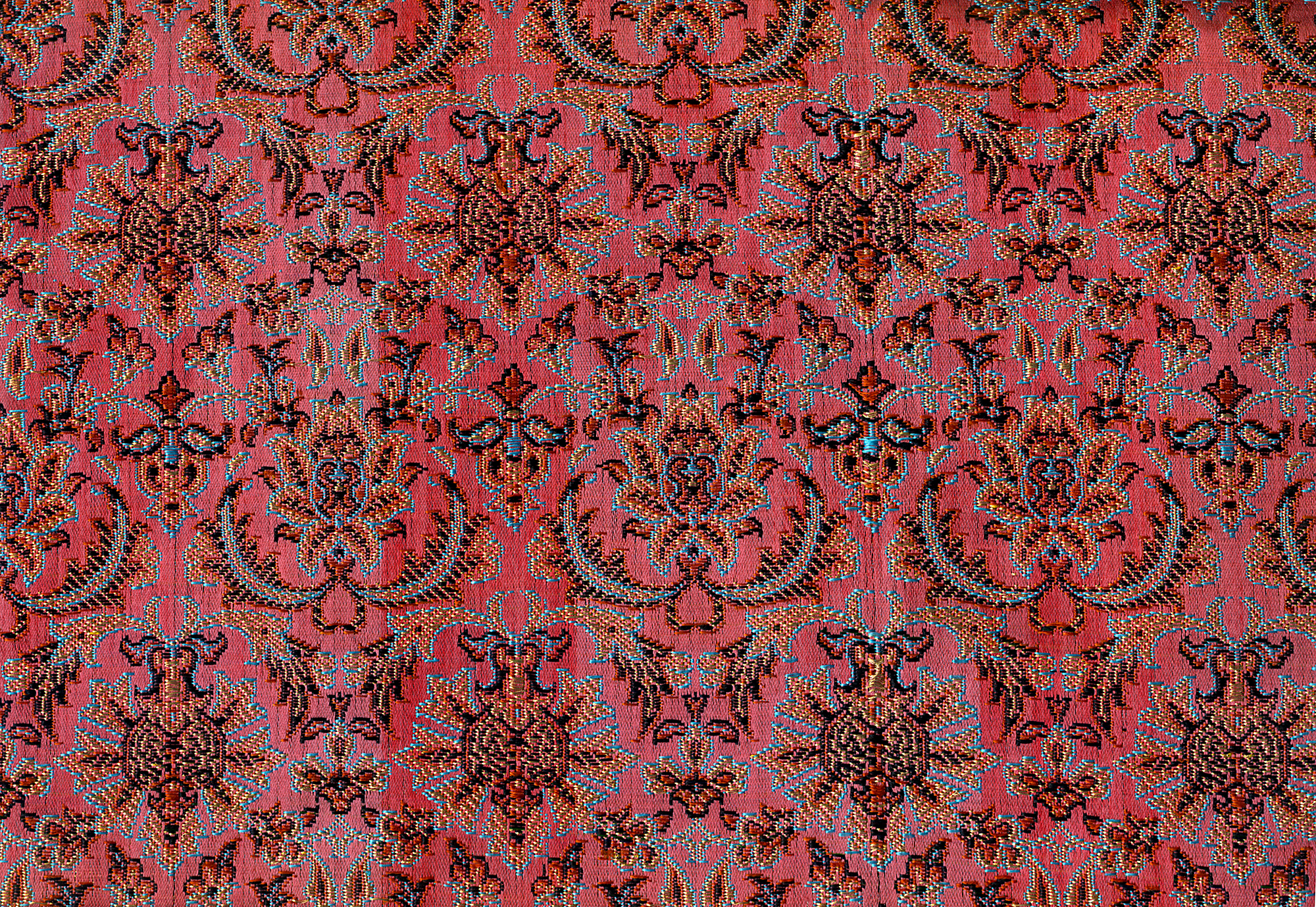
A carpet with the Shãh Abbãsi design

The Shãh Abbãsi floral design (motif) was commissioned by Shãh Abbãs the Great, originally to decorate the tiles of Esfahan's mosques. As rug weavers take inspiration from their surroundings, the design quickly found its way to Esfahan's rug weaving industry. Whilst the Shãh Abbãsi floral motif originated in Esfahan, its use today is widespread in nearly every rug weaving region of Iran.
