= Battle of Chillianwala =

1849 battle of the Second Anglo-Sikh War

- Part of the Second Anglo-Sikh War
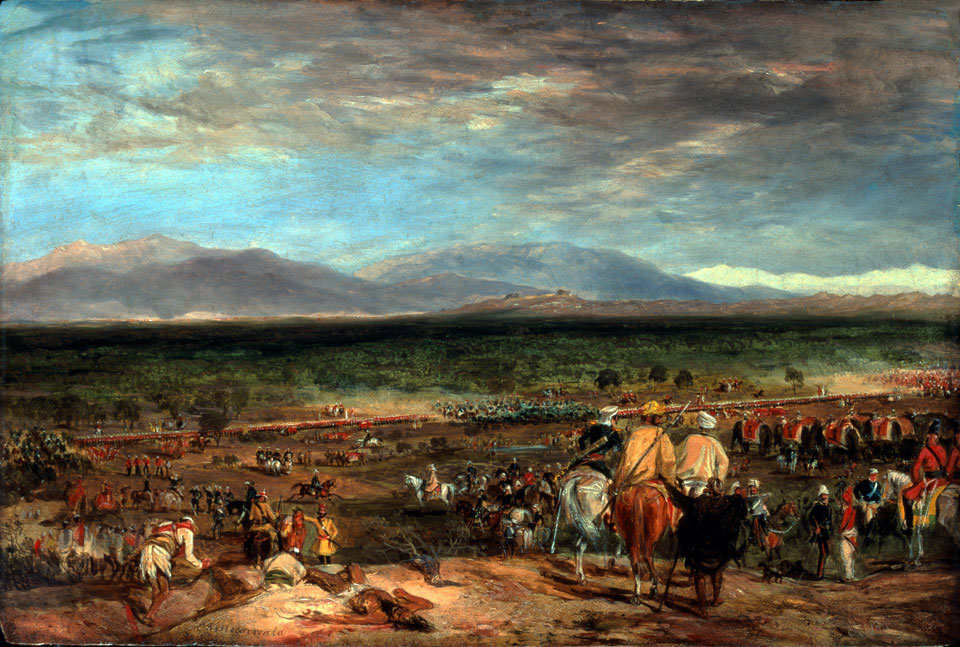
- c. 1849 painting of the battle
Date	13 January 1849
Location	Chillianwala, Punjab
Result	See Aftermath

Belligerents
United Kingdom; East India Company	Sikh Empire

Commanders and leaders
Sir Hugh Gough; John Pennycuick †; Lt. Col. Brooks †	Sher Singh

Strength
12,000; 100 guns	10,000–20,000; 62 guns

Casualties and losses
602 killed 1,651 wounded 104 missing	4,000–8,000 killed, wounded or missing

The Battle of Chillianwala (also spelled Chillianwallah) was fought in January 1849 during the Second Anglo-Sikh War in the Chillianwala region (Mandi Bahauddin) of Punjab, now part of Pakistan. The battle was one of the bloodiest fought by the British East India Company. Both armies held their positions at the end of the battle and both sides claimed victory. The battle was a strategic check to immediate British ambitions in India and a shock to British military prestige.

== Background ==
The Second Anglo-Sikh War broke out in the Punjab, which had recently lost much of its independence to the British East India Company following the First Anglo-Sikh War, in April 1848, when the city of Multan rebelled under Dewan Mulraj. The East India Company's Commissioner for the Punjab, Frederick Currie, sent several forces of locally raised troops to help quell the revolt. One of these forces consisted largely of Sikhs, formerly from the Sikh Khalsa Army, under Sher Singh Attariwalla. Some junior British Political Officers viewed this development with alarm as Sher Singh's father, Chattar Singh Attariwalla, was known to be plotting sedition in Hazara, north of the Punjab.

On 14 September, Sher Singh's army also rebelled. Other than opposition to the British, Mulraj and Sher Singh had no aims in common. Sher Singh decided to move his army north, to join that of Chattar Singh, who had also rebelled. However, some British officers had taken steps to secure vital fortresses. For the time being, Chattar Singh was unable to leave Hazara, as the British held Attock on the Indus River, and the passes over the Margalla Hills separating Hazara from the Punjab. Instead, Sher Singh moved a few miles north and fortified the crossings over the Chenab River, while awaiting events.

The East India Company responded by announcing their intention to depose the young Maharaja, Duleep Singh, annexe the Punjab and confiscate the lands of any landholders who joined the revolt. While an army under Major General Whish resumed the Siege of Multan, the company ordered the formation of an Army of the Punjab under the veteran Commander in Chief, Sir Hugh Gough. However, both Gough and the Governor General, the 37-year-old Lord Dalhousie, delayed operations until after the end of the monsoon season, allowing Sher Singh to gather reinforcements and establish strong positions. Gough took charge of the Army on 21 November. The next day, he attacked Sher Singh's bridgehead on the left bank of the Chenab at Ramnagar but was repulsed, raising Sikh morale.

On 1 December, a cavalry division under Major-General Joseph Thackwell crossed the Chenab upstream from Ramnagar. Sher Singh advanced against him, resulting in a day-long artillery duel at Sadullapur. Gough meanwhile bombarded the empty Sikh positions at Ramnagar, and postponed a general attack until the next day. During the night, Sher Singh withdrew to the north. Gough then halted, awaiting further instructions from Dalhousie. Early in January 1849, news came that the British had recaptured the city of Multan (although Mulraj still defended the citadel), but also that the Muslim garrison of Attock had defected to Amir Dost Mohammad Khan of Afghanistan, who was half-heartedly supporting Chattar Singh. The fall of Attock nevertheless allowed Chattar Singh's army to leave Hazara and move south. Dalhousie ordered Gough to seek out and destroy Sher Singh's main army before the Sikh armies could combine, without waiting for reinforcements from the army at Multan.

== Battle ==
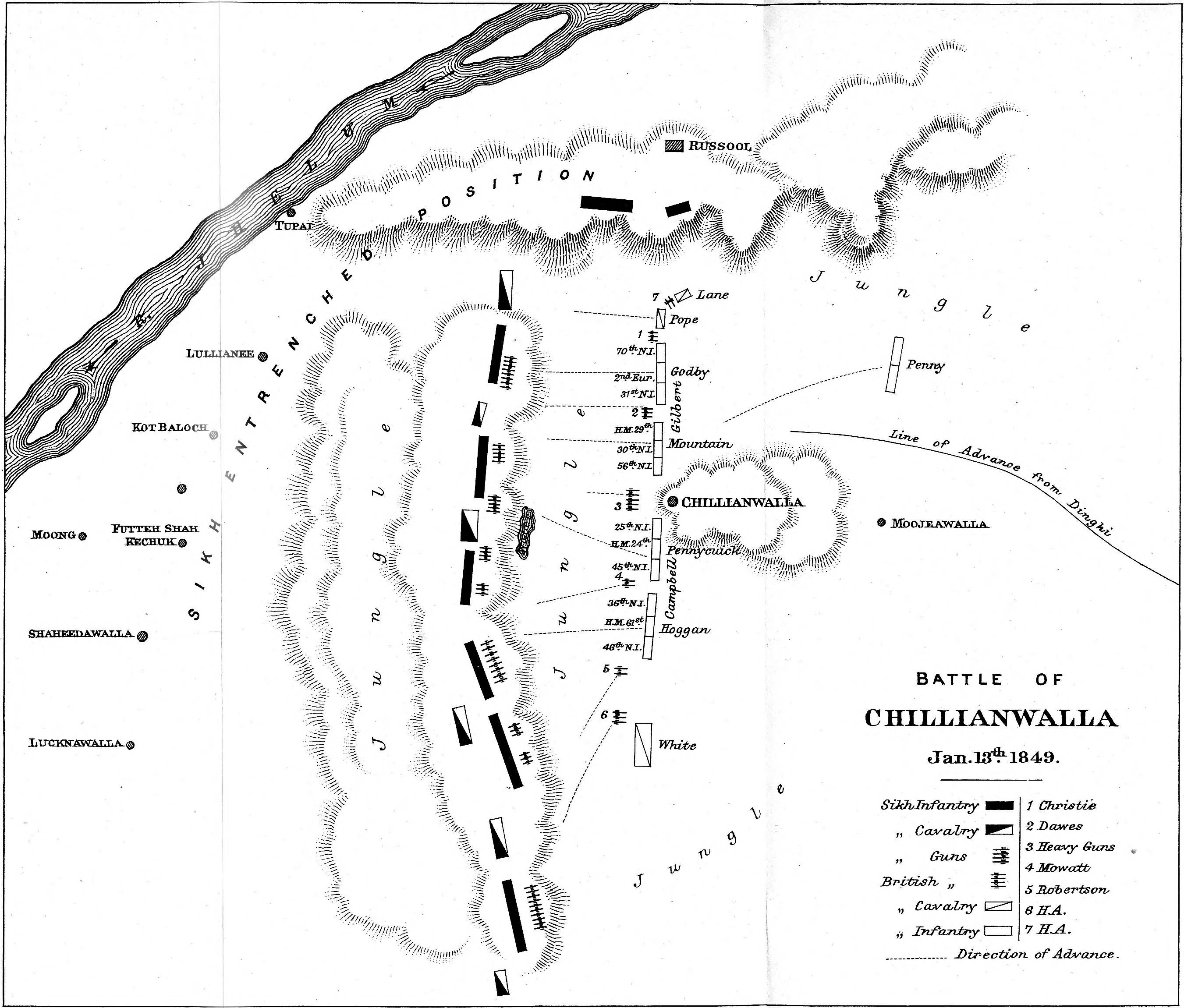
Map of the battle

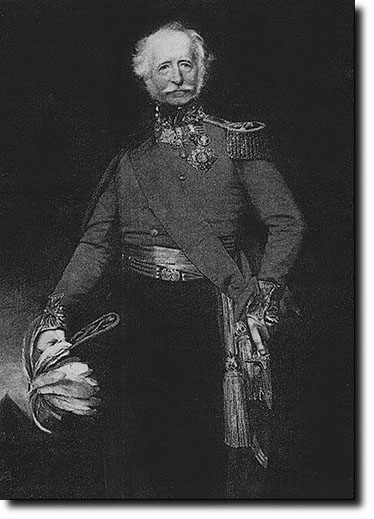
Hugh Gough, 1st Viscount Gough (1779–1869), Oriental Club, Hanover Square, London.

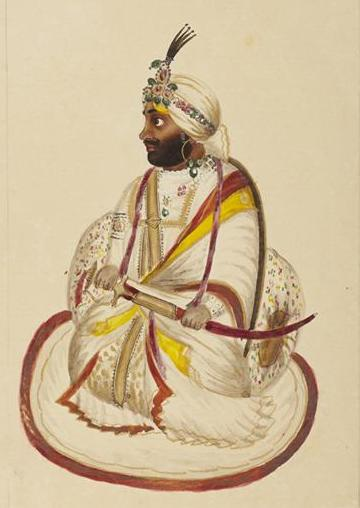
Sher Singh Attariwalla

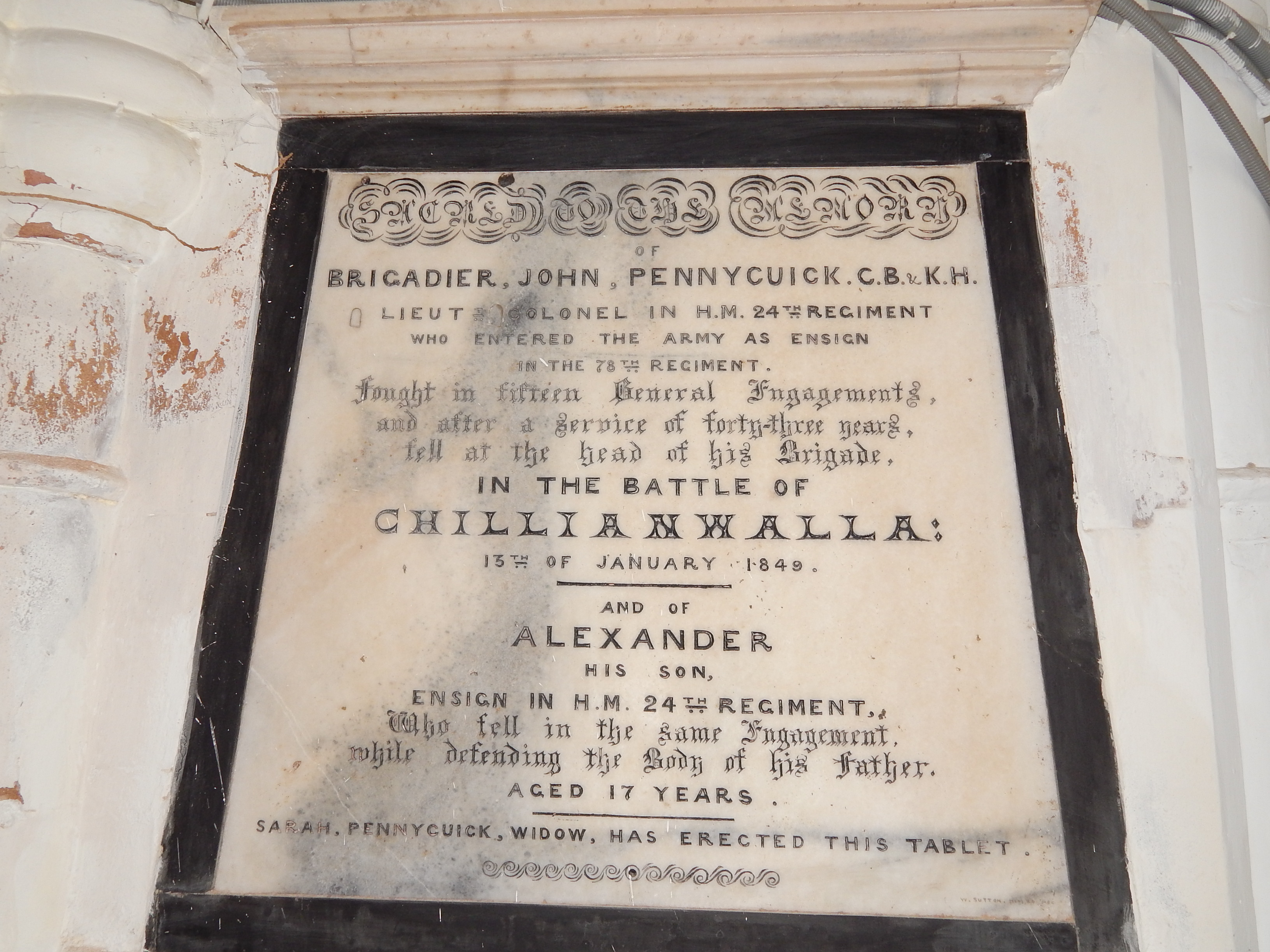
Picture of the plaque erected in St James Church Sialkot Cantonment by Sarah Pennycuick, widow of Brigadier John Pennycuick and mother of Alexander of 24th Regiment, both of whom died in Battle of Chillianwala on 13 January 1849.

On 13 January, Gough's army was marching towards the reported Sikh position at Rasul, on the left bank of the Jhelum River, about 85 miles (137 km) north-west of Lahore. At noon, they drove a Sikh outpost out of the village of Chillianwala. At this point, Gough intended to march round to the north of the Sikh position and attack its left flank on the following day, but from the vantage point of a mound near Chillianwala, it was apparent that the Sikhs had advanced from their original positions along ridges close to the Jhelum. Sher Singh's army had originally occupied a position six miles long, too extended for their numbers and vulnerable to a flank attack such as Gough proposed. By advancing, Sher Singh made a British flank march too risky and forced the British to make a frontal attack.

It was estimated by Frederick Mackeson, Gough's attached political officer, that Sher Singh's army numbered 23,000 (although most later British historians put it at 30,000-40,000), including 5,000 irregular cavalry, with some 62 guns. However after the First Anglo-Sikh War, the Khalsa was reduced to 12,000 infantry and 60 guns in total, so some historians have stated the Sikh army could not have been more than 10,000 on the day. The Sikh army consisted of three main bodies of troops. On the left under Sher Singh himself were one cavalry regiment, nine infantry battalions, some irregulars and 20 guns, occupying some low hills and ridges. In the centre under Lal Singh were two cavalry regiments, ten infantry battalions and 17 guns, mostly concealed in or behind belts of scrub and jungle. On the right was a brigade which formerly had garrisoned Bannu, consisting of one cavalry regiment, four infantry battalions and eleven guns, anchored on two villages. Other irregulars extended Sher Singh's left flank.

Gough intended to delay the attack until the following day, but as his army prepared to pitch camp, hitherto concealed Sikh artillery opened fire from positions much closer than had been anticipated. Gough later wrote that he feared the Sikhs might bombard his encampments overnight, though some of his officers believed he had merely been stung into hasty action. Gough's army was composed of two infantry divisions, each of two brigades, each in turn of one British and two Bengal Native infantry battalions, with a total of 66 guns from the Bengal Artillery and Bengal Horse Artillery. Overall Gough's total strength was about 12,000-13,000 men.

The 3rd Division under Sir Colin Campbell, with two field artillery batteries and three horse artillery troops, was deployed on the left, while the 2nd Division commanded by Major General Sir Walter Gilbert was deployed on the right with a field artillery battery and three horse artillery troops. Gough also had a cavalry division under Major General Joseph Thackwell, but this was split, with one brigade on each flank; Brigadier White's on the left, Brigadier Pope's on the right. Gough deployed two heavy artillery batteries with eight 18-pounder guns and four 8-inch howitzers in the centre. A brigade of Bengal Native troops under Brigadier Penney was in reserve.

Gough ordered the advance to commence at about 3:00 pm. From the outset, the right-hand brigade of Campbell's division, commanded by Brigadier Pennycuick, was in difficulties. Because the jungle made it difficult for Campbell to coordinate his two brigades, he assumed personal command of the left hand brigade under Brigadier Hoggan, while ordering Pennycuick to attack with the bayonet. The British regiment of Pennycuick's brigade was the 24th Foot, which had only recently arrived in India. They advanced very rapidly, but lost cohesion and also lost touch with the rest of the brigade in the thick scrub. Trying to attack Sikh guns head-on, they suffered heavily from grapeshot. When they reached the main Sikh positions, Sikh resistance was desperate and the 24th were driven back. The Queen's colours were lost, although the Sikhs never claimed to have captured them and they were either destroyed or conceivably buried with the officer who had carried them.

Pennycuick's brigade eventually became completely disorganised and had to make its way back to the start line in small parties. Pennycuick himself was killed. Campbell's left hand brigade (under Brigadier Hoggan and Campbell himself) had greater success. The 61st Foot captured several guns and even an elephant, and Brigadier White's cavalry followed up with an effective charge. Hoggan's troops eventually met the left-hand brigade of Gilbert's division, commanded by Brigadier Mountain, behind the Sikhs' centre positions. On Gough's right however, his troops had met with disaster. While Gilbert's two brigades had at first successfully driven the Sikhs before them, capturing or spiking several guns, on their right flank, Brigadier Pope (who was almost an invalid) first ordered an ineffective cavalry charge through thorn scrub which threw his brigade into confusion, and then panicked and ordered a retreat. One of his British cavalry regiments, the 14th Light Dragoons, routed.

The Sikhs followed up the fleeing cavalry and captured four guns. They then attacked Gilbert's right-hand infantry brigade, commanded by Brigadier Godby, from the rear, forcing him to withdraw under heavy pressure until Penney's reserve brigade came to his aid. By now, darkness was approaching. The Sikhs had been driven from many of their positions with heavy casualties, but were still fighting strongly. With some of his formations rendered ineffective, or having to fight their way out of encirclement, Gough ordered a withdrawal to the start line. Although his units brought back as many wounded as they could, many of them could not be found in the scrub. Many of the abandoned wounded were killed during the night by roving Sikh irregulars. Gough's retreat also allowed the Sikhs to recapture all but twelve of the guns the British had taken earlier in the day.

== Casualties ==
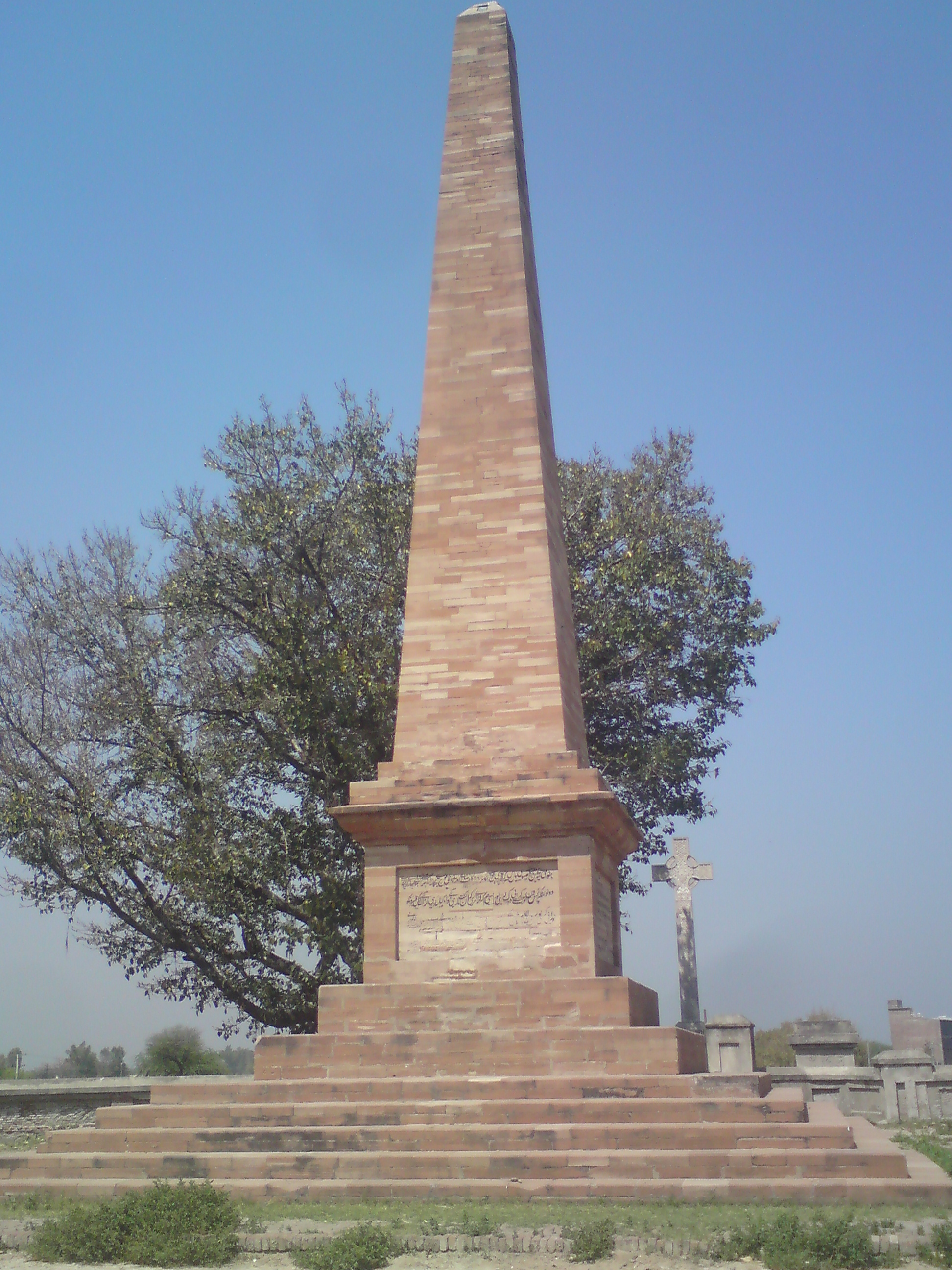
A monument was erected in memory of the losses sustained by both armies

The final losses to Gough's army were 602 killed, 1,651 wounded and 104 missing for a total of 2,357. According to Khushwant Singh and Jagtar Singh Grewal, around 3,000 men on the British side died in the battle. According to Patwant Singh, there was a total of 2,446 casualties for the British side, with 132 officers killed. A comparatively high proportion of the casualties (almost 1,000) were British rather than Indian. This was mainly a result of the disaster which befell the 24th Foot, which suffered 255 killed and 335 wounded, over 50% of its strength. Sikh casualties were estimated at 4,000-8,000 in total.

Gough later recorded that 'In no action do I remember seeing so many of an enemy's slain upon the same space- Sobraon perhaps only excepted.'

An obelisk later erected at Chillianwalla by the British government preserves the names of the European and native officers who fell in the battle.

== Aftermath ==
Both armies held their positions at the end of the battle, and claimed a victory. The Sikhs claimed a victory because they broke the British force, which retreated. The British claim a victory as the Sikhs appeared to have disengaged first. According to Khushwant Singh and J. S. Grewal, the battle was a British defeat. According to Patwant Singh, the battle was a "disaster" for the British. Heavy rain then set in, discouraging both armies from renewing the battle.

Some at least of Chattar Singh's army from Attock joined Sher Singh at Rasul. Since it had been the British aim to prevent these two Sikh armies from joining, this was a distinct British setback. The British withdrew three days after the battle ended. The Sikhs claimed that they forced the British to retreat, but Gough had actually withdrawn due to the rains which separated the two armies. However, the Sikhs were unable to find sufficient food in the area and Sher Singh, who commanded the combined Sikh armies, also withdrew to the north. Since the Sikhs disengaged first, the British claimed the victory, although they admitted that the Sikhs missed an opportunity to gain a victory. However, the repulse of the British, together with the loss of several guns and the colours of the 24th and two other regiments, and the rout of the 14th Light Dragoons, dealt a blow to British morale and is testament to the tenacity and martial skill of the Sikh army. A testimony left by a British observer says:

The Sikhs fought like devils, fierce and untamed... Such a mass of men I never set eyes on and as plucky as lions: they ran right on the bayonets and struck their assailants when they were transfixed.

Two later editorials by the military historian Major A.H. Amin stated:

At Chillianwala a British Army which had a high European troop component, a large number of Sepoy (regiments), sufficient artillery, two heavy cavalry brigades to ensure that no one could surprise the British army, excellent logistics, little campaign exhaustion having fought no major battle since assumption of hostilities... failed to defeat the Sikhs... The Battle of Chillianwala fought on 13 January 1849 is, however, one odd exception and stands out as a battle in which the British failed to defeat their opponents despite having the advantages of weight of numbers (sic), ideal weather and terrain, superior logistics etc.

Gough initially claimed the battle was a victory over the Sikhs but Dalhousie criticized this claim as "poetical". The result of Chillianwala strengthened Dalhouse's mission to annex the Sikh kingdom, which was being spoken against by Auckland, Ellenborough, Hardinge, and Henry Lawrence at the Cabinet. Gough was criticised for his handling of the battle, was relieved of command and superseded by General Charles James Napier. Before Napier could arrive from England to take over command, Gough had fought the decisive Battle of Gujrat. The loss of British prestige at Chillianwala was one of the factors which contributed to the Indian Rebellion of 1857 some nine years later. However, the Sikh soldiers recruited into the East India Company's Bengal Army and Punjab Irregular Force remained loyal to Britain and helped crush the rebellion. Later in the Revolt of 1857 Hindu poet Prakashanth Das wrote a short poem in Hindi-

"हाल ही में मैंने रंग-बिरंगे कपड़े पहने हजारों सैनिकों को क्षितिज में बिना म्यान के तलवारें लहराते हुए देखा। हनुमान का एक लाल झंडा उठा और झाँसी की सेना रो पड़ी और चिल्लाई "चिल्लनवाला याद करो।"

Roughly translated it states:

Recently I saw thousands of troops clothed in colorful cloth, with swords unsheathed charging into the horizon. A red banner of Hanuman rose and the army of Jhansi cried and screamed "Remember Chillanwala."

This even influenced the Namdhari Revolt of 1871 and Ram Kuka many times talked about the Battle of Chillianwala. Within the British Army, such was the consternation over the events at Chillianwala that, after the disastrous Charge of the Light Brigade, when Lord Lucan remarked "This is a most serious matter", General Richard Airey replied, "These sort of things will happen in war. It is nothing to Chillianwala."

== Order of battle ==
=== British Army ===
- 3rd King's Own Light Dragoons
- 9th Queen's Royal Light Dragoons (Lancers)
- 14th the King's Light Dragoons
- 24th Foot
- 29th Foot
- 61st Foot

=== Bengal Army ===
- 1st Bengal Light Cavalry
- 5th Bengal Light Cavalry
- 6th Bengal Light Cavalry
- 9th Bengal Light Cavalry
- 2nd Bengal (European) Light Infantry
- 6th Bengal Native Infantry
- 15th Bengal Native Infantry
- 20th Bengal Native Infantry
- 25th Bengal Native Infantry
- 30th Bengal Native Infantry
- 31st Bengal Native Infantry
- 36th Bengal Native Infantry
- 45th Bengal Native Infantry
- 46th Bengal Native Infantry
- 56th Bengal Native Infantry
- 69th Bengal Native Infantry
- 70th Bengal Native Infantry

== Gallery ==
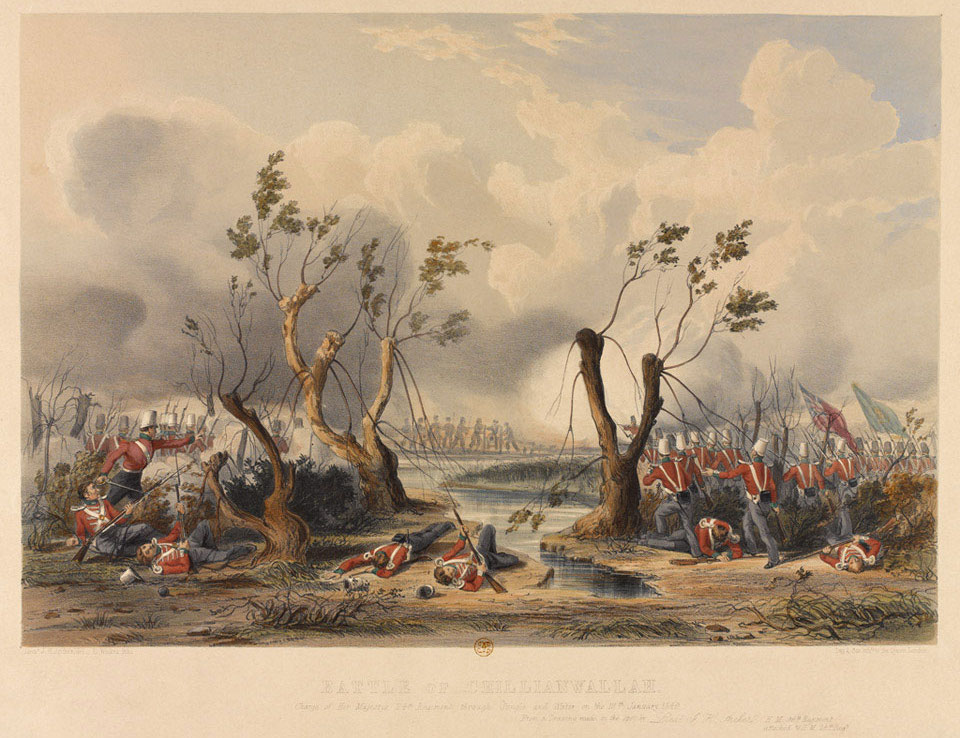
Battle of Chillianwallah. Charge of H M 24th Regiment through jungle and water, 13 January 1849.

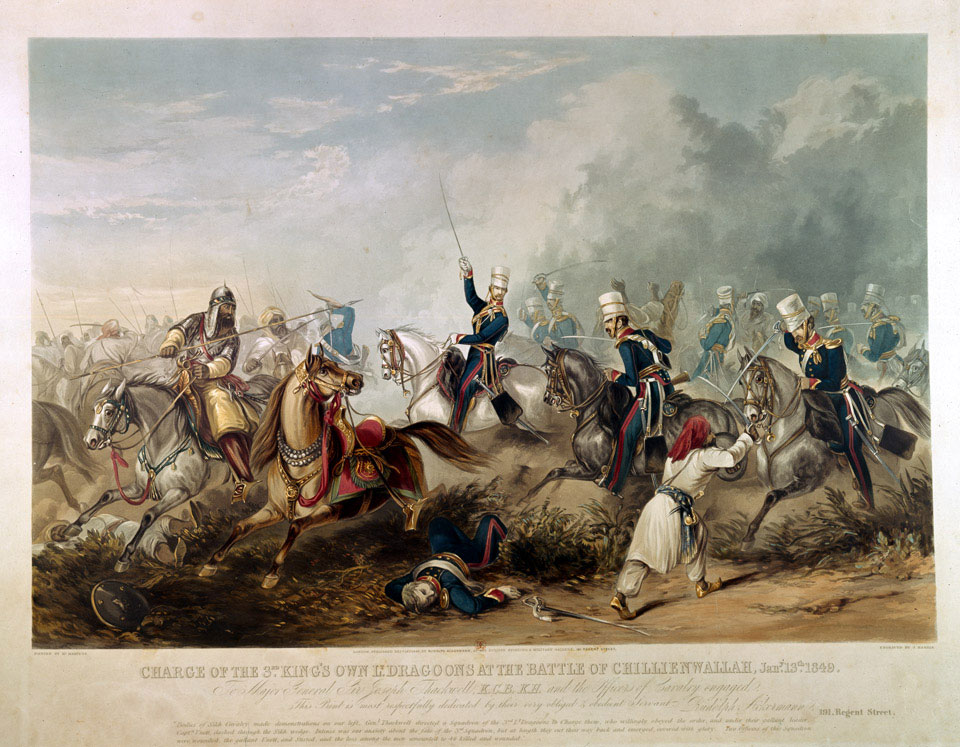
Charge of the 3rd King's Own Light Dragoons at the Battle of Chillienwallah, 13 January 1849.

== Bibliography ==
- Allen, Charles (2000). Soldier Sahibs. Abacus. ISBN 0-349-11456-0.
- Farwell, Byron (1973). Queen Victoria's Little Wars. Wordsworth Military Library. ISBN 1-84022-216-6.
- Heath, Ian (2005). The Sikh Army, 1799–1849. London: Osprey Publishing.
- Hernon, Ian (2002). Britain's Forgotten Wars. Sutton Publishing. ISBN 0-7509-3162-0.
- Holmes, Richard (2002). Redcoat: The British soldier in the Age of Horse and Musket. London: HarperCollins. ISBN 0-00-653152-0.
- Keay, John (2000). India: A History. New York: HarperCollins. ISBN 978-0-00-638784-8.
- Sadler, Stanley (2002). Ground warfare: an international encyclopedia, Volume 1 (illustrated ed.). ABC-CLIO. ISBN 978-1-57607-344-5.
- Woodham-Smith, Cecil (1960). The Reason Why. New York: E. P. Dutton & Co.
