= Pindi Bahauddin =

Coordinates: 32°36′0″N 73°29′0″E

Pindi Bahauddin Pindi Purani
- Village and union council
- Interactive map of Pindi Bahauddin
- Country: Pakistan
- Province: Punjab
- District: Mandi Bahauddin District
- Time zone: UTC+5 (PST)

Pindi Bahauddin also known as Pindi Purani is a village and union council of Mandi Bahauddin District in the Punjab province of Pakistan. It is located at 32°36'0N 73°28'60E at an altitude of 217 metres (715 feet).
