= Wasu, Punjab =

Coordinates: 32°33′48″N 73°29′03″E

Wasu (Urdu: واسو) is a village and Union Council of Mandi Bahauddin District in the Punjab province of Pakistan. It has an altitude of 221 metres (728 feet). A Government Girls High School is located here.
