= Kuthiala Sheikhan =

- Town and Union council
- Location in Pakistan
- Coordinates: 32°28′N 73°25′E
- Country: Pakistan
- Province: Punjab
- District: Mandi Bahauddin
- Time zone: UTC+5 (PST)

Kuthiala Sheikhan is a town and union council of Mandi Bahauddin District in the Punjab province of Pakistan. It is located at an altitude of 217 metres (715 feet).
