= Mangat, Pakistan =

Village in Mandi Bahauddin District

Coordinates: 32°31′0″N 73°30′0″E

Mangat is a village and union council of Mandi Bahauddin District in the Punjab province of Pakistan. The 1998 Census of Pakistan recorded Mangat's population as 14,006 residents. According to the 2017 Census of Pakistan, Mangat had a population of 18,589 residents.

The village, which is part of Mandi Bahauddin Tehsil, is located at 32°31'0N 73°30'0E, at an altitude of 223 metres (734 feet).

== Notable people ==
1. Ali Ibrahim Mangat – A notorious criminal associated with the Lahore underworld.
2. Jamshed Mangat – A folk singer from Rawalpindi, associated with Coke Studio.
