= Bhikhi, Pakistan =

Bhikhi Sharif
- Village and union council
- Location within Pakistan
- Coordinates: 32°30′N 73°25′E
- Country: Pakistan
- Province: Punjab
- District: Mandi Bahauddin

Government
  - Type: democratic
- Time zone: UTC+5 (PST)
- Postal code: 50471

Bhikhi Sharif is a village and union council of Mandi Bahauddin District in the Punjab province of Pakistan. It has an altitude of 216 metres (709 ft).

The economy is largely agrarian and the main crops of the village are cereals, rice, and wheat.
