= Mong, Punjab =

Village in Punjab, Pakistan

Coordinates: 32°38′48″N 73°30′36″E

Mong or Mung (مونگ ) is a village and Union Council of Mandi Bahauddin District in the Punjab province of Pakistan.

== History ==
According to Alexander Cunningham, Mong was built on the site of the ancient city of Nicaea which was founded by Alexander the Great in commemoration of his victory over Porus in the Battle of the Hydaspes. However, the ruins of the city of Nicea have not been found yet, not least because the landscape has changed somewhat. The 1910 edition of Encyclopædia Britannica cited Mong as the location of Nicaea, but the latest edition does not state this.

According to The Imperial Gazetteer of India: "The overthrow of the Bactrians by the Parthians in the latter half of the second century brought another change of rulers, and the coins of the Indo-Scythian king Maues (c. 120 BCE), who is known to local tradition as Raja Moga, have been found at Mong". At the end of the first century CE the whole of the Punjab was conquered by the Yueh-chi."

Almost 2 millennia later, at almost the same location, a few kilometers from Mong, the British forces under Lord Gough and the Khalsa Sikh Army fought the 1849 Battle of Chillianwala in the Second Anglo-Sikh War.
