= Chillianwala =

Chillianwala چیلیانوالہ
- Village
- Location within Pakistan
- Coordinates: 32.656947°N 73.603465°E
- Country: Pakistan
- Province: Punjab
- Division: Gujrat
- District: Mandi Bahauddin

Area
  - Total: 15 km^{2} (5.8 sq mi)
- Elevation: 218 m (715 ft)

Population
  - Total: 20,000
- Time zone: UTC+5 (PST)
- Calling code: 0546

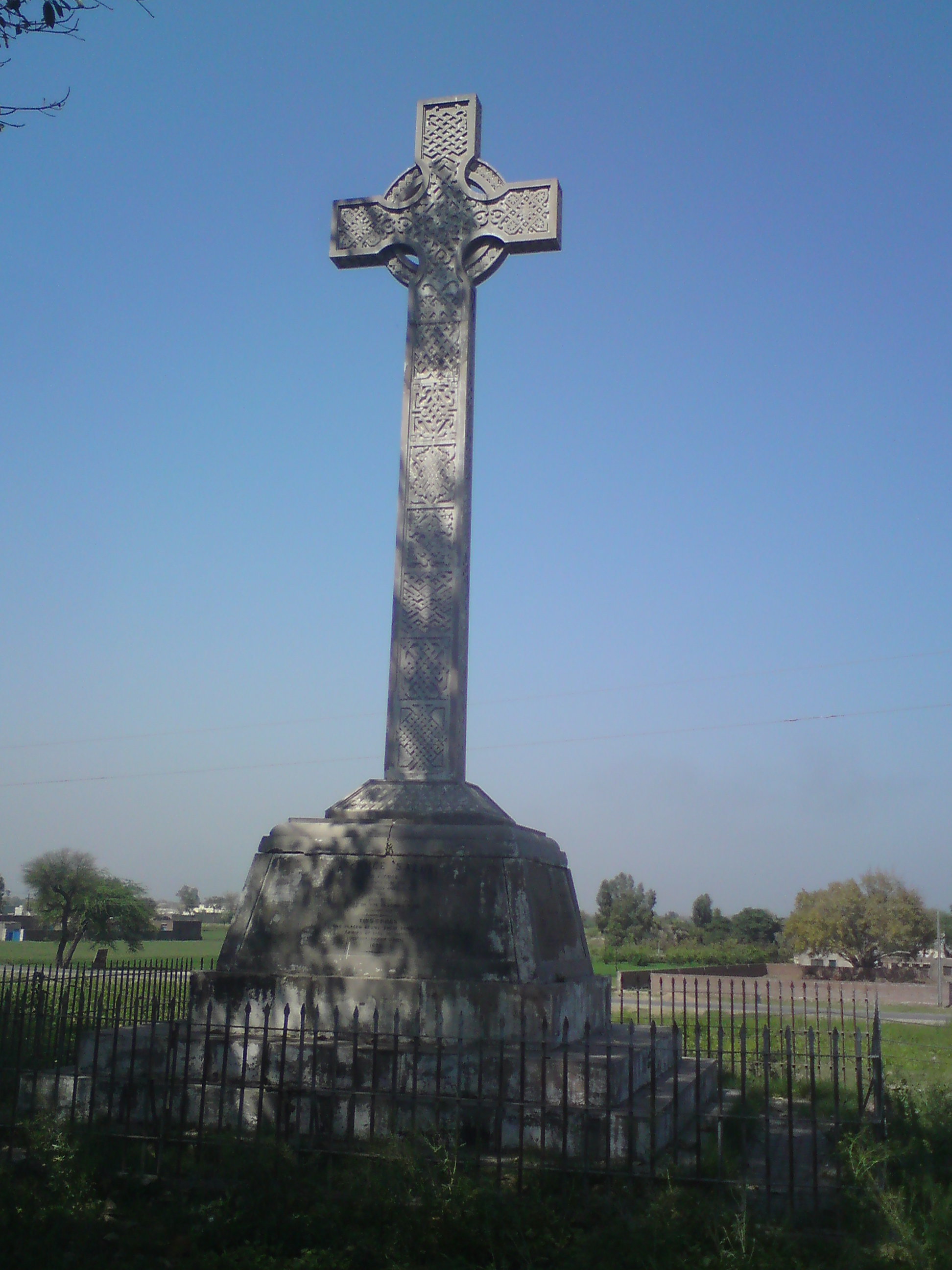
The monument of the Battle of Chillianwala is positioned near the graveyards to honour the fallen soldiers

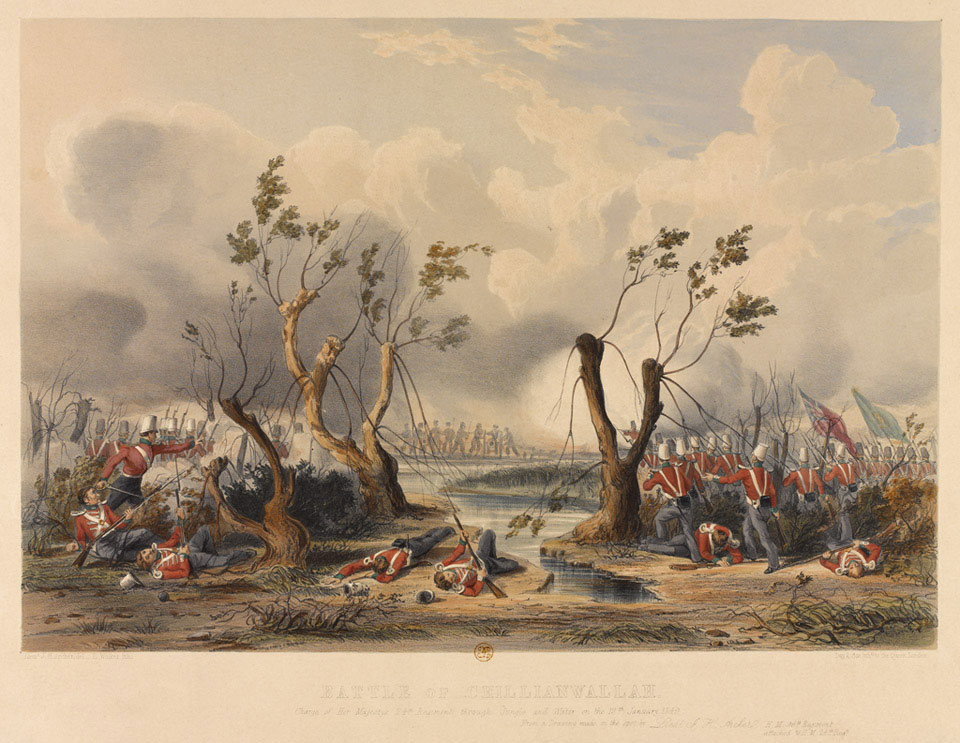
Battle of Chillianwallah - Charge of H M 24th Regiment through jungle and water 13 January 1849

Chillianwala (also spelled Chellianwala) is a village and union council of Mandi Bahauddin District in the Punjab province of Pakistan. It is located at 32°39'0N 73°36'0E at an altitude of 218 metres (718 feet) and lies to the north-east of the district capital Mandi Bahauddin.

The most notable site in the centre of the village is a war memorial and graveyard which contains graves of British officers and mass graves of soldiers of the opposing sides at the Battle of Chillianwala. It is both deeply respected by the citizens of Chillianwala, and surrounding towns and villages; a few million rupees have been donated by the Government of Punjab for the restoration of the war memorial and graveyard whereas further efforts are still being put in to highlight its historical importance and military significance.

Chillianwala and the locale to the west of the town was the site of the Battle of Chillianwala fought on 13 January 1849 during the Second Anglo-Sikh War between the Sikh Empire and East India Company.

== See also ==
- Battle of Chillianwala
- Chillianwala railway station
