= Phalia =

Town in Punjab, Pakistan

Phalia پھالیہ
- City
- Location within Pakistan Phalia (Pakistan)
- Coordinates: 32°25′58″N 73°34′40″E
- Country: Pakistan
- Province: (Punjab, Pakistan) Punjab
- Division: Gujrat
- District: Mandi Bahauddin
- Administrator: Bilal Feroz Joya AC
- No. of Towns: 4

Government
  - Type: Union Council

Population (2023)
  - City: 62,453
  - Metro: 635,651 (Phalia tehsil)
- Demonym: Phalian
- Time zone: UTC+5 (PST)
- Postal code: 50430
- Dialling code: 0546

Phalia (Punjabi تحصیل پھالیہ ) is a town and headquarters of Phalia Tehsil of Mandi Bahauddin District, Punjab, Pakistan.

== History ==
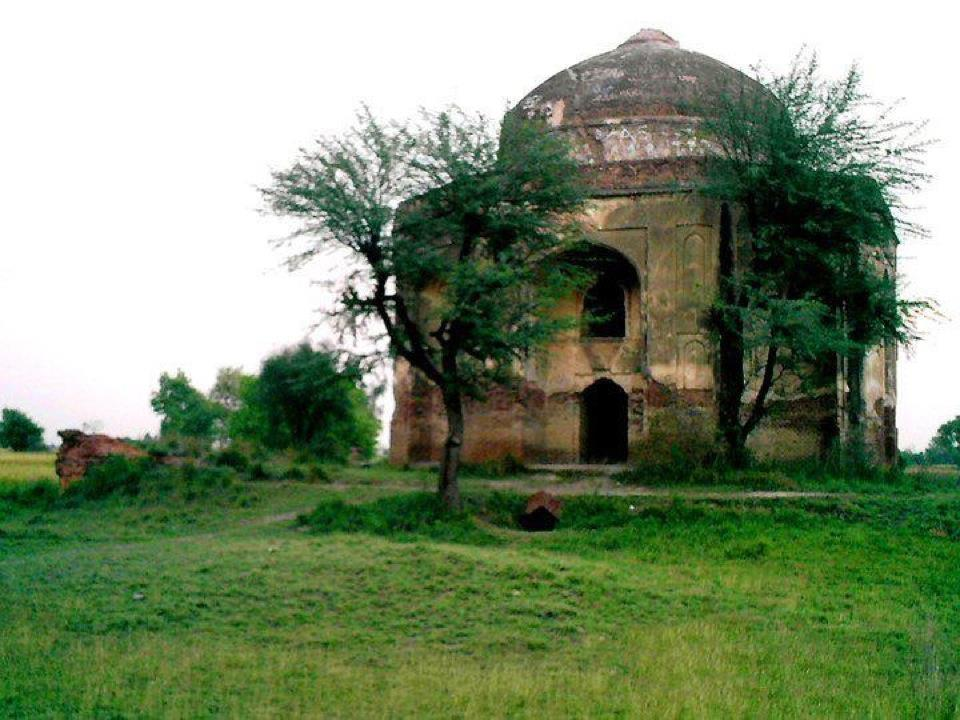
Shrine of Sheikh Ali Baig

Alexander the Great and his army crossed the Jhelum River (Hydaspes) in July 326 BC at the Battle of the Hydaspes River where he defeated king Porus. According to Arrian (Anabasis, 29), Alexander built a city in the place whence he started to cross the river, which he named Bukephala or Bucephala to honour his dead horse Bukephalus or Bucephalus. It is thought that ancient Bukephala was near the site of modern Jhelum City but that is wrong. Phalia was named after Bucephalus, the name of the Alexander's dead horse, and presently a tehsil of Mandi Bahauddin District. Beyond Taxila, Alexander opted for an alternative route instead of the traditional route i.e. today's Grand Trunk Road (link through Pakistan between Afghanistan and Bangladesh) and built two cities on opposite banks of the Jhelum on the route between Bhera and Mong.

In AD 997, Sultan Mahmud Ghaznavi took over the Ghaznavid dynasty empire established by his father, Sultan Sebuktegin. In 1005 he conquered the Shahis in Kabul and followed it by the conquests of Punjab region. The Delhi Sultanate and later Mughal Empire ruled the region. The Punjab region became predominantly Muslim due to missionary Sufi saints whose dargahs dot the landscape of Punjab region. Jalalpur Sharif is located on west of the river Jhelum whereas Phalia on eastern bank in Mandi Bahauddin District close to river Jhelum earlier known as Hydaspes. A semi hill or mound i.e. the historical sign of the ancient city and a shrine still available in mid of the Mohalla Ameer. In 2010, maximum of the area reshaped into commercial land and precious heritage could not be preserved.

After the decline of the Mughal Empire, the Sikh invaded and occupied Mandi Bahauddin District. The Muslims faced severe restrictions during the Sikh rule. During the period of British rule, Mandi Bahauddin District increased in population and importance.

The predominantly Muslim population supported Muslim League and Pakistan Movement. After the independence of Pakistan in 1947, the minority Hindus and Sikhs migrated to India while the Muslims refugees from India settled down in the Mandi Bahauddin District.

Phalia is approximately the same age as Lahore. The four subdivisions (Mohallas) are named after the forefathers of Tarar tribe:

- Phalia Ameer for "Muhammad Ameer"
- Phalia Keeman for "Muhammad Karim"
- Phalia Boota for "Muhammad Boota" (also known as "Nawan Lok")
- Phalia Mehman for "Muhammad Khan"

== Geography and climate ==
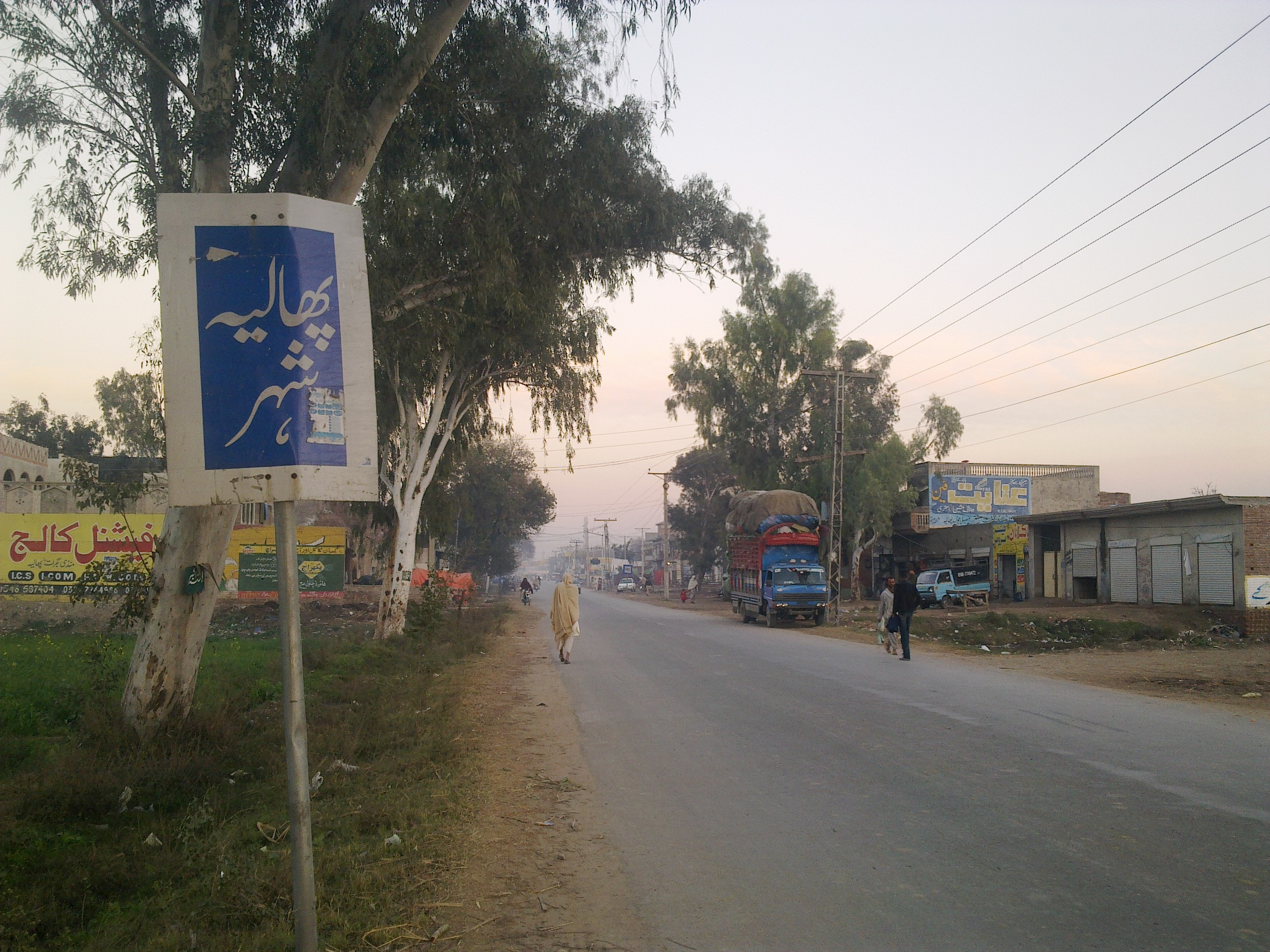
Phalia Town entrance

Phalia is situated at 32.43 N latitude and 73.58 E longitude. It is located between the main cities of Mandi Bahauddin and Gujrat, about 23 kilometres from Mandi Bahauddin and 50 kilometres (31 mi) from Gujrat and 45 kilometres (28 mi) from Malakwal and near about 80 kilometres (50 mi) from Salam interchange on M-2 motorway, at an altitude of 672 feet (205 m) above sea level.

Phalia has a moderate climate, which is hot in summer and cold in winter. During peak summer, the day temperature rises up to 40 °C (104 °F). The winter months are mild and the minimum temperature may fall below −2 °C (28 °F). The average annual rainfall in the district is 50 millimetres (2.0 in).

In 2025 floods, flood inundated over 140 villages in Mandi Bahauddin District, causing significant damage to homes, roads, and crops.

== Population ==
Census	Population
1972	8,565
1981	13,193
1998	21,678
2017	52,789
2023	62,453

== Health facilities ==
Health Medical facilities are on average available in the city. The main government hospital established in the city is THH (Tehsil Headquarters Hospital). There are several other private hospitals, Health center and Clinics at different locations within the city.

== Phalia City ==
- Population and religions

Phalia is not a big city. Most of the population of the village are Muslim with some Christians.

- Languages

Punjabi language is the native language of the province and is most widely spoken language in Phalia.

- Registered voters

The number of registered voters in the Constituency PP-117 (Mandi Bahuddin-II) Phalia is 134,119. among them almost half of them are of female voters.

== Administration ==
After the abolition of Nazim system, the Administrator of Phalia is Assistant Commissioner Bilal Feroz Joya in 2016.

== Notable people ==
- Mustansar Hussain Tarar
- Muhammad Tariq Tarar
- Pir Syed Muhammad Binyamin Rizvi
- Parvaiz Mehdi Qureshi
- Asif Bashir Bhagat
- Basma Riaz Choudhry
- Muhammad Ijaz Ahmed Chaudhary
