= Mandi Bahauddin =

Mandi Bahauddin منڈی بہاء الدین (Punjabi)
- City
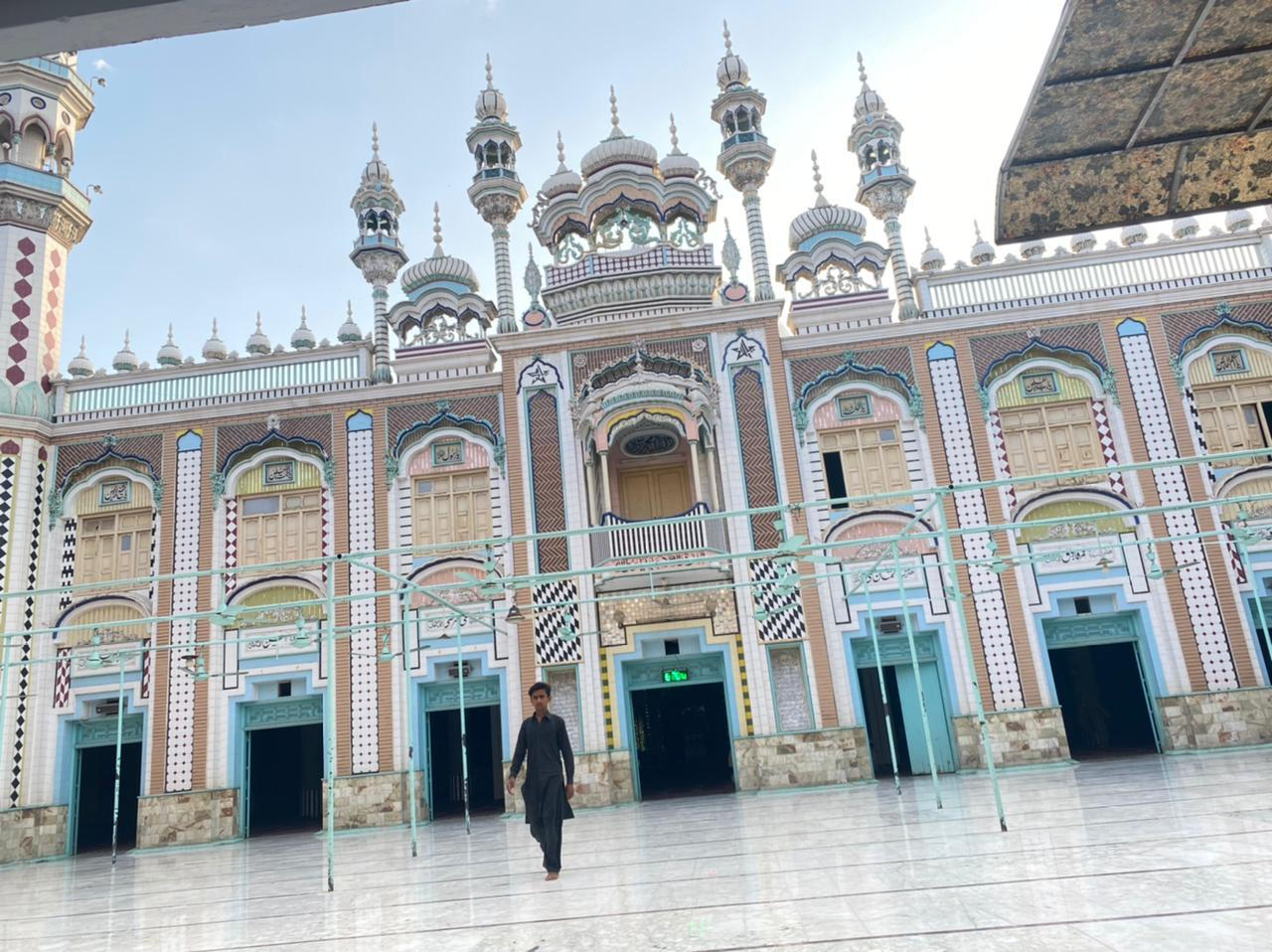
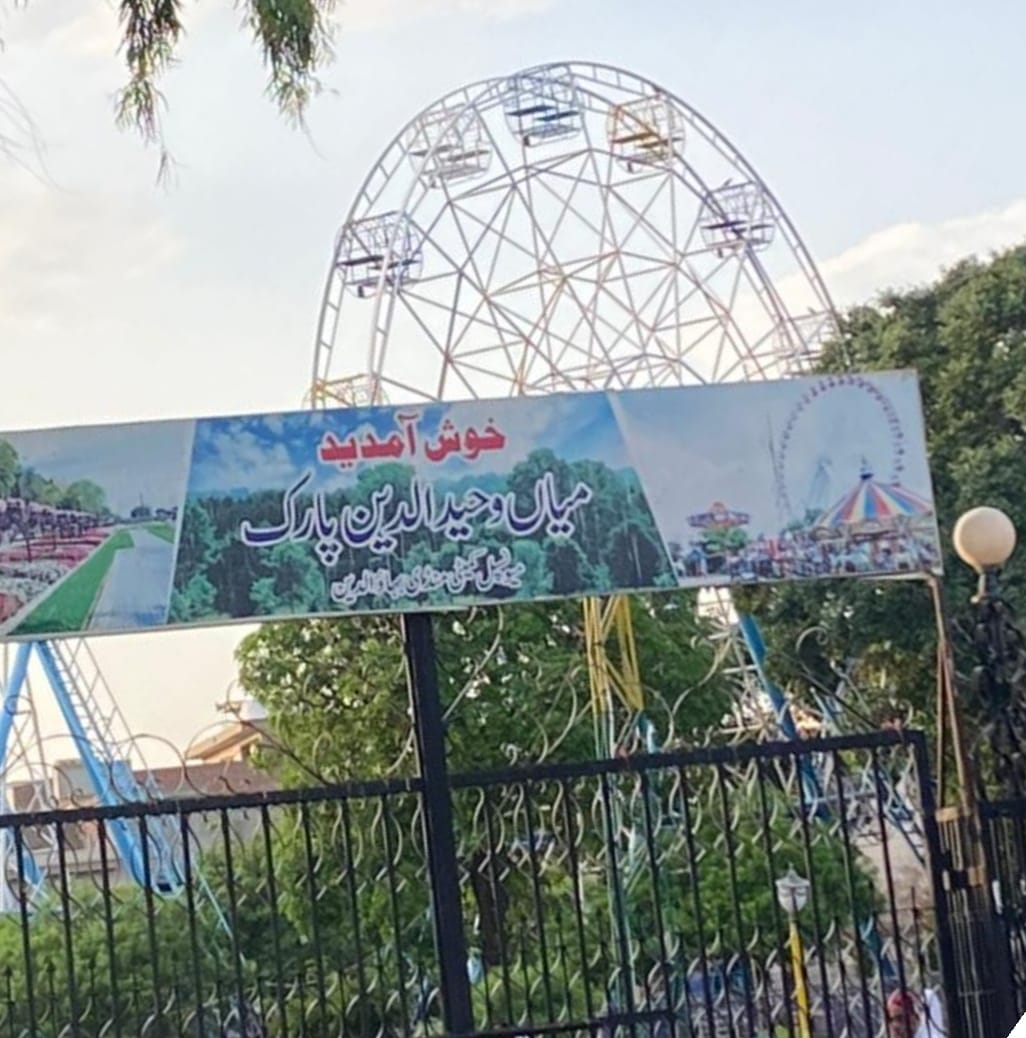
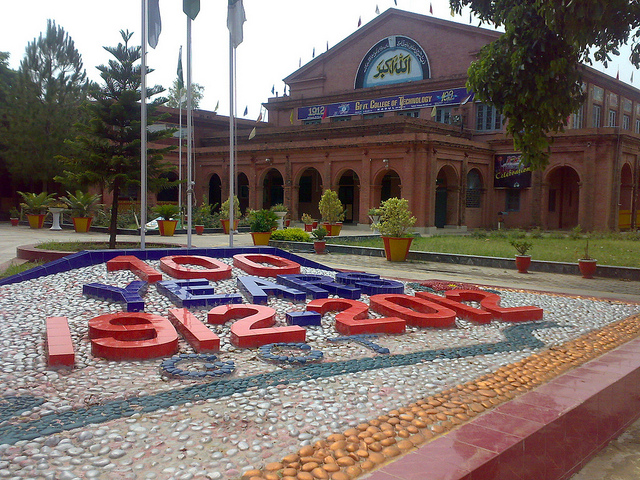
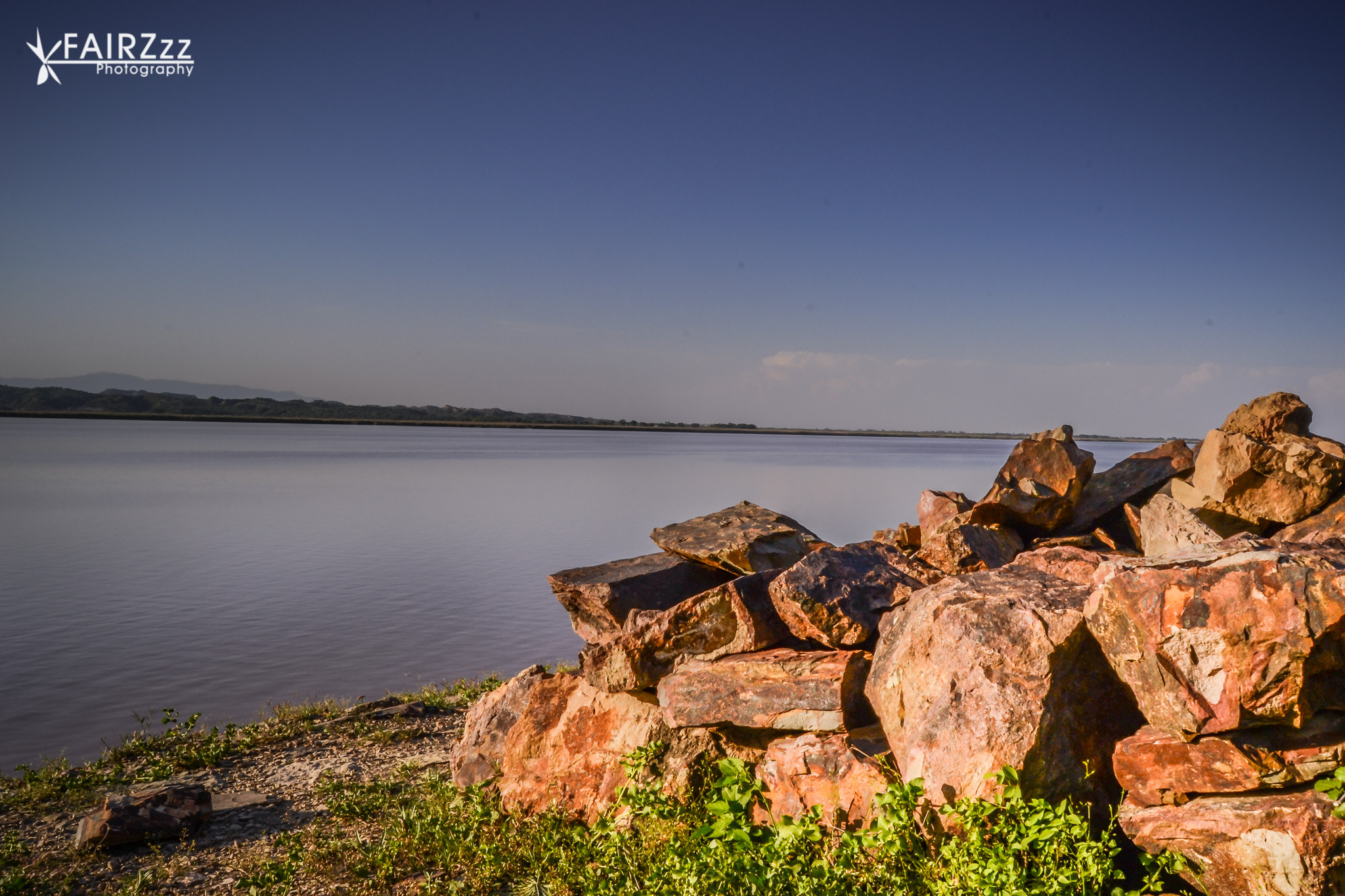
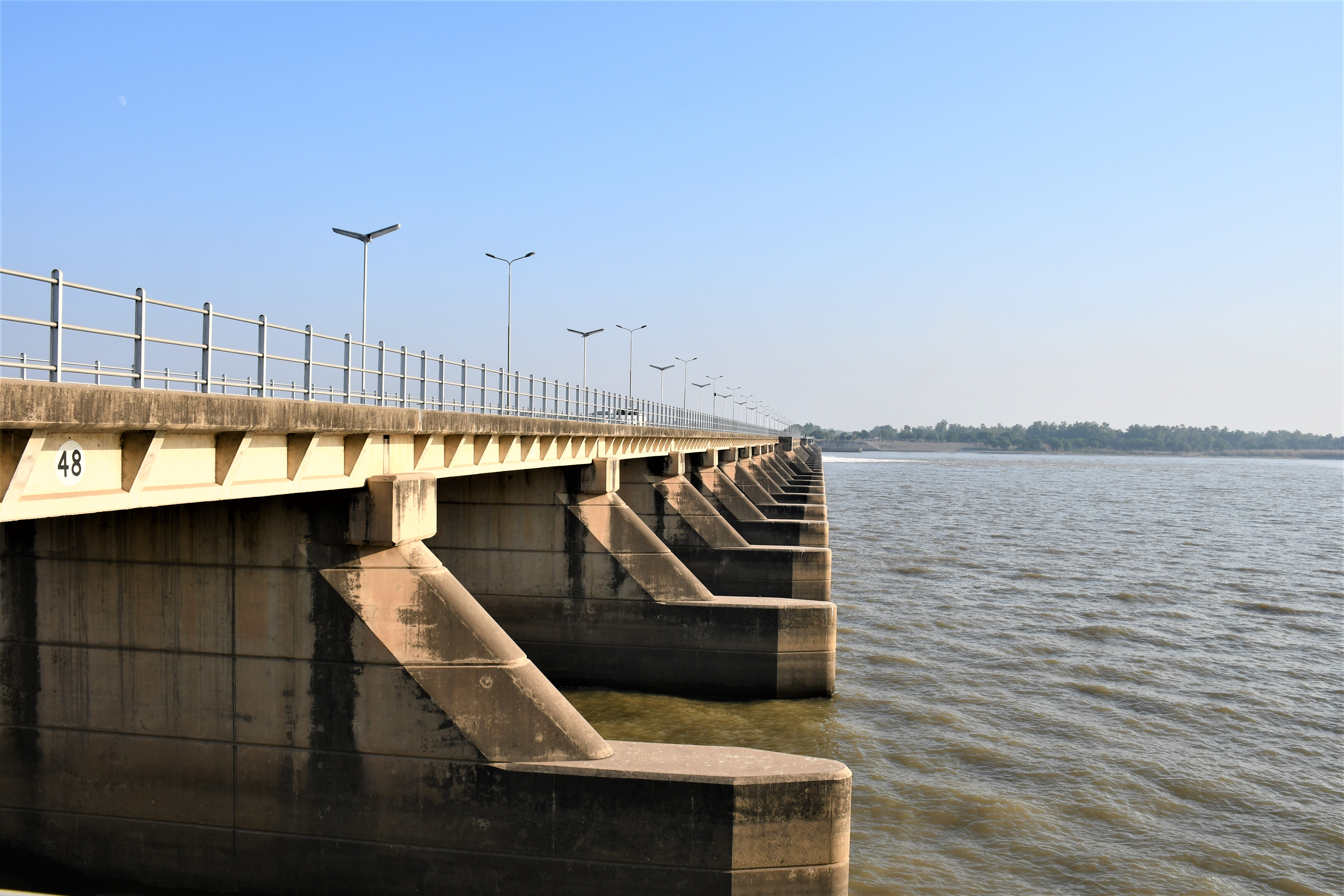
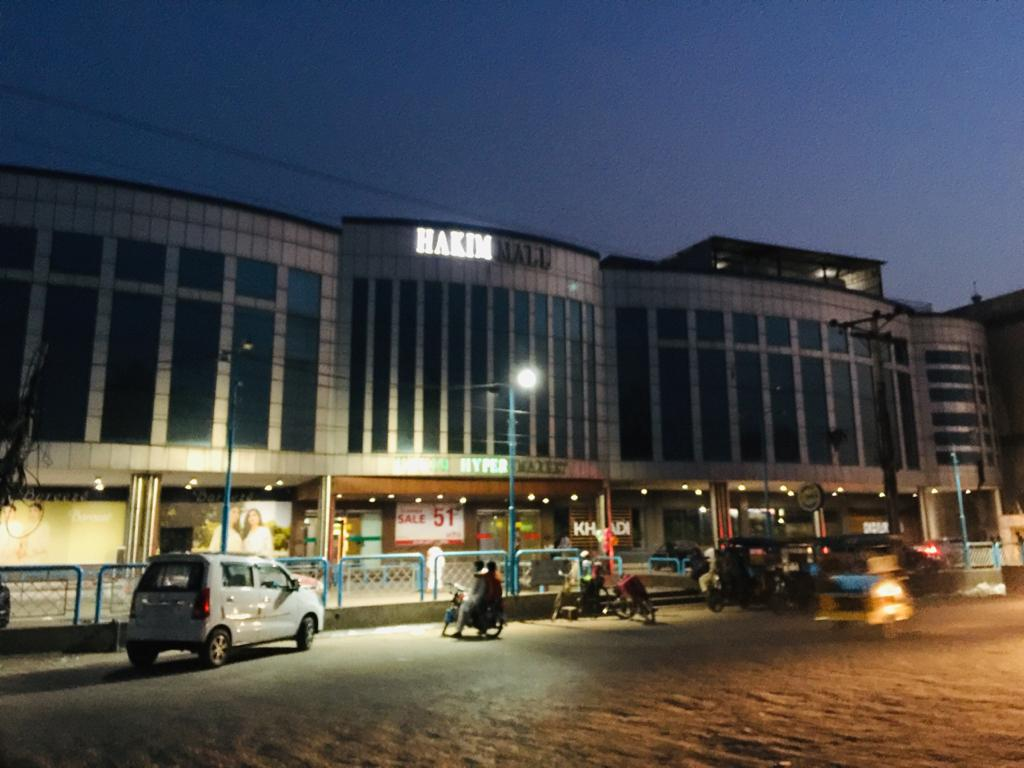
- Clockwise from top: Jamia Masjid Ghausia Rizvia, University of Engineering & Technology, Rasul, Rasul Barrage, Hakim Mall, Jhelum River, Mian Waheed Ud Din Park

- Location within Punjab Mandi Bahauddin (Pakistan)
- Coordinates: 32°34′47″N 73°28′53″E
- Country: Pakistan
- Province: (Punjab, Pakistan) Punjab
- Division: Gujrat
- District: Mandi Bahauddin
- Established: 1506 AD
- NA/PP: 2/5 N.A (85,86) P.P(65,66,67,68)
- No. of Towns: List: Phalia up to p50: for separate parts to be listed-->

Government
  - Type: Municipal Committee
  - Union Councils: 27
  - Deputy Commissioner: Adeel Haider Baryar (PAS)
- Elevation: 204 m (669 ft)

Population (2023)
  - Total: 232,361
  - Rank: 43rd in Pakistan
- Demonym: Mandi Aala
- Time zone: UTC+5 (PST)
- Postal code: 50400
- Dialling code: 0546
- Website: www.mbdin.com

Mandi Bahauddin (Punjabi / Urdu: مَنْڈی بَہَاءُ الدِّین, romanized: manḍī bahā-ud-dīn Punjabi: [mɐ̃ɳˈɖiː ˈbä˥ʊ̯˩d̪ˑiːnᵊ]; Urdu: [mə̃nˈɖiː ˈbəɦɑːʊ̯d̪.d̪iːn]) is a city in Punjab, Pakistan. It is also called "The City of Lions" and "The Land of Judges". It is also the capital of Mandi Bahauddin District. It is the 43rd most populous city in Pakistan, according to the 2023 census. The city is about 220 metres above sea level and is located between the rivers Jhelum (north 12 km) and Chenab (south 39 km).

The name of the town originates from two sources, Mandi was a prefix because it was a grain market and Bahauddin was a Sufi saint.

== History ==
=== Foundation of Mandi Bhauddin ===
In 1506 C.E. a Gondal tribal Chief named Bahauddin established a settlement namely Pindi Bahauddin, after his migration from Pindi Shahjahanian to this area. The town started growing in early 20th century near the ancient village named as Chak No.51, where Sikh, Hindu and Muslim businessmen and land owners came to settle. John Alam made the map of this chak, which became the center of this new town Pindi Bahauddin. later in 1920 because of famous grain market setup in this Chak No. 51, it was given name of Mandi-Bahauddin, in 1923 all the streets and roads were laid straight and wide. In 1924 Pindi-Bahauddin Railway station was given the name of Mandi Bahauddin railway station. In 1937 when Mandi-Bahauddin was town, it was given the status of a town committee and in 1941 it got the status of a Municipal Committee. In the master plan of reconstructing this town. In 1946, nine gates and the walls were retied around this town.

=== Early history ===
The recorded history of Mandi Bahauddin goes back to the era of Alexander the Great. Some 8 km northwest of the modern-day Mandi Bahauddin town, at the village Mong on the southern bank of the Jhelum River (Greek: Hydaspes), the battle Battle of the Hydaspes River was fought between Raja Porus (Sanskrit: Paurava) and Alexander the Great in 326 BCE. The kingdom of Raja Porus was situated in the northern Punjab of modern Pakistan. This was the last major fight of Alexander's career; the Macedonians, after finding a fierce resistance by Porus, and having heard of a massive 4,000 elephant force mustered by eastern kingdoms, refused to march further toward the Ganges Plains. The Sadar Gate built during the British era in 1933 is present here.

== Administration ==
Mandi Bahauddin, the capital of the district, is also the Tehsil headquarters. Mandi Bahauddin was raised to the level of Municipal Committee in 1941. It was given the status of Municipal Committee after the implementation of Punjab Local Government Ordinance 2001. Municipal Committee of Mandi Bahauddin Tehsil is subdivided into three tehsils and eighty Union Councils:

Name of Tehsil	Number of Union Councils
Malakwal	20
Mandi Bahauddin	30
Phalia	30
Total	80

== Demographics ==
=== Population ===
Historical population
Year	Pop.	±% p.a.
1951	17,171	—
1961	22,295	+2.65%
1972	36,172	+4.50%
1981	44,796	+2.40%
1998	99,496	+4.81%
2017	198,609	+3.70%
2023	232,361	+2.65%

According to 2023 census, Mandi Bahauddin had a population of 232,361. As per the 1998 Census of Pakistan, the population of city was recorded as 99,496 while at the 2017 Census, the population of city had risen to 198,609 with an increase of over 99.62% in 19 years.

=== Religion ===
Religious groups in Mandi Bahauddin City (1941−2017) (Note: 1941: Data for the entirety of the town of Mandi Bahauddin, which included Mandi Bahauddin Municipality.)
Religious group	1941		2017	
Religious group	Pop.	%	Pop.	%
Hinduism	6,146 (Note: Including Ad-Dharmis)	48.2%	86	0.04%
Sikhism	4,277	33.54%	—N/a	—N/a
Islam	2,268	17.79%	214,722	98.84%
Christianity	61	0.48%	2,191	1.01%
Ahmadiyya	—N/a	—N/a	214	0.1%
Others	0	0%	19	0.01%
Total population	12,752	100%	217,232	100%

== Geography ==
The district forms a central portion of the Chaj Doab lying between the Jhelum and Chenab rivers. It lies from 30° 8' to 32° 40' N and 73° 36' to 73° 37' E. The tehsil headquarters towns of Phalia and Malikwal are 22.5 and 28.5 kilometres (14.0 and 17.7 mi) from Mandi Bahauddin, respectively. It is bounded on the north by the Jhelum river, which separates it from Jhelum district; on the west by Sargodha district; on the south by the river Chenab (which separates it from the Gujranwala and Hafizabad districts); and on the east by Gujrat district. The total area of the district is 2,673 square kilometres (1,032 sq mi). The district comprises the Mandi Bahauddin Tehsil, Phalia Tehsil, and Malikwal Tehsils.

=== Climate ===
This district has a moderate climate, hot in summer and cold in winter. During the peak of summer, the temperature may rise to 48 °C (118 °F) during the day, but in the winter months, the minimum temperature may fall below 3 °C (37 °F). The average rainfall in the district is 988 millimetres (38.9 in) and mainly resonates with the weather in Islamabad.

== Languages ==
Urban Population of Mandi Bahauddin Tehsil (2023)
1. Punjabi (79.5%)
2. Urdu (17.5%)
3. Pashto (2.47%)
4. Others (0.49%)

The primary tongue spoken in the Mandi Bahauddin as per the 2023 census, is Punjabi, spoken as the first language by 79.53% of the population, followed by at Urdu 17.51%, Pashto 2.47% and 0.49% spoke Other languages (mostly Sindhi and Saraiki).

== Transport ==
- Road-Links: Mandi Bahauddin District has road links with the Lahore–Islamabad Motorway (Salam & Bhera Interchanges), Gujranwala District, Hafizabad, Gujrat, Jhelum, and Sargodha. These inter-district roads are maintained by the Provincial Highways Department.
- Railways: From Lalamusa the standard-gauge railway line to the west of the Punjab serves Mandi Bahauddin District with stations at Chak Sher Muhammad railway station, Chillianwala, Mandi Bahauddin, and Ahla onwards to Malakwal
- Helipad: A facility of Helipad used for VIP movements is also available at city Mandi Bahauddin maintained by Pakistan Rangers, Mandi Bahauddin.

== Educational institutions ==
Schools in the city include,

- Beaconhouse School System
- Punjab College of Science
- Punjab Group of Colleges
- The Superior College
- District Jinnah Mandi Bahuddin

== Medical facilities ==
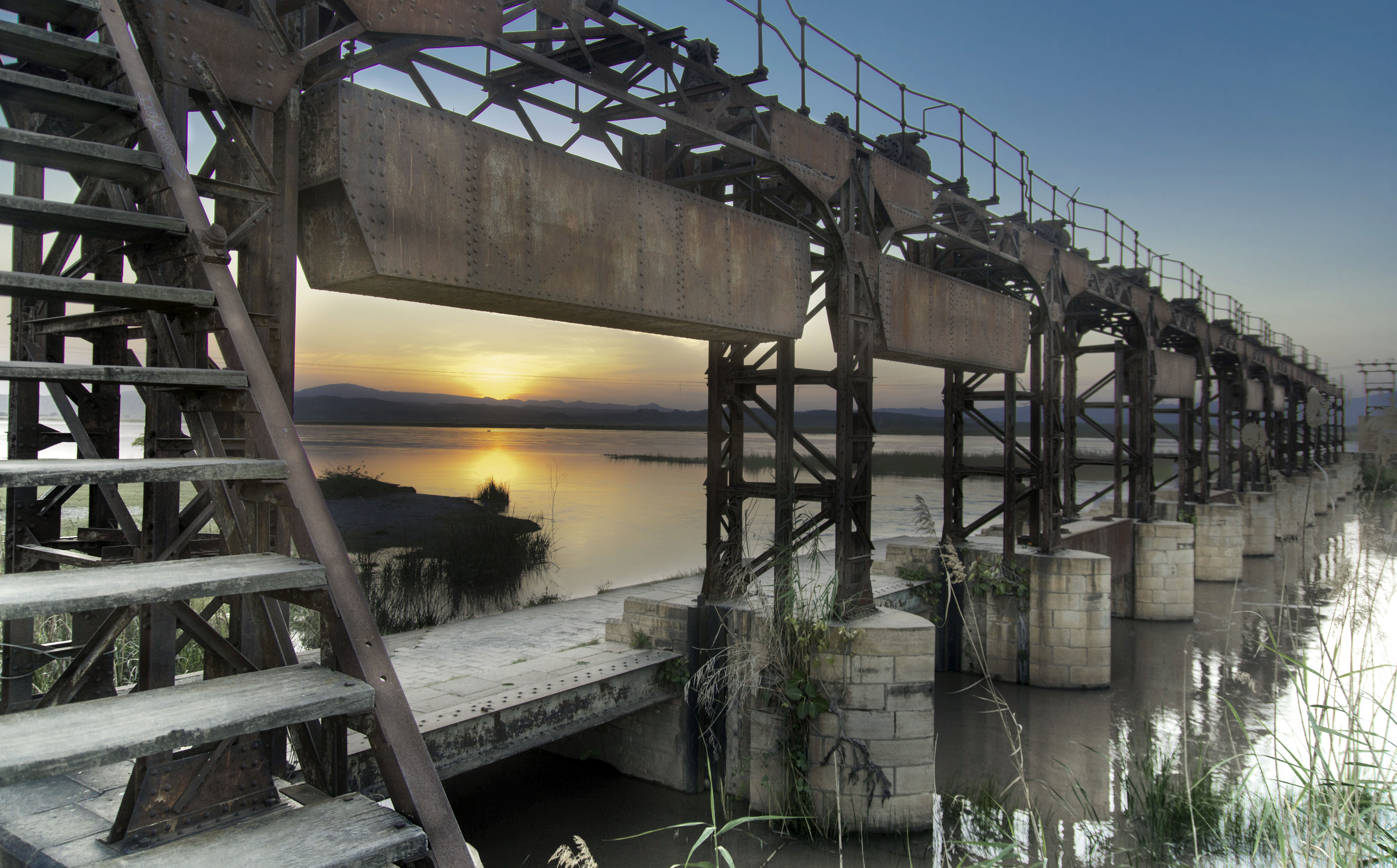
Old Rasul Barrage

- District Headquarter Hospital, Mandi Bahauddin
- Government Children Hospital Mandi Bahauddin

== Tourism ==
- Rasul Barrage

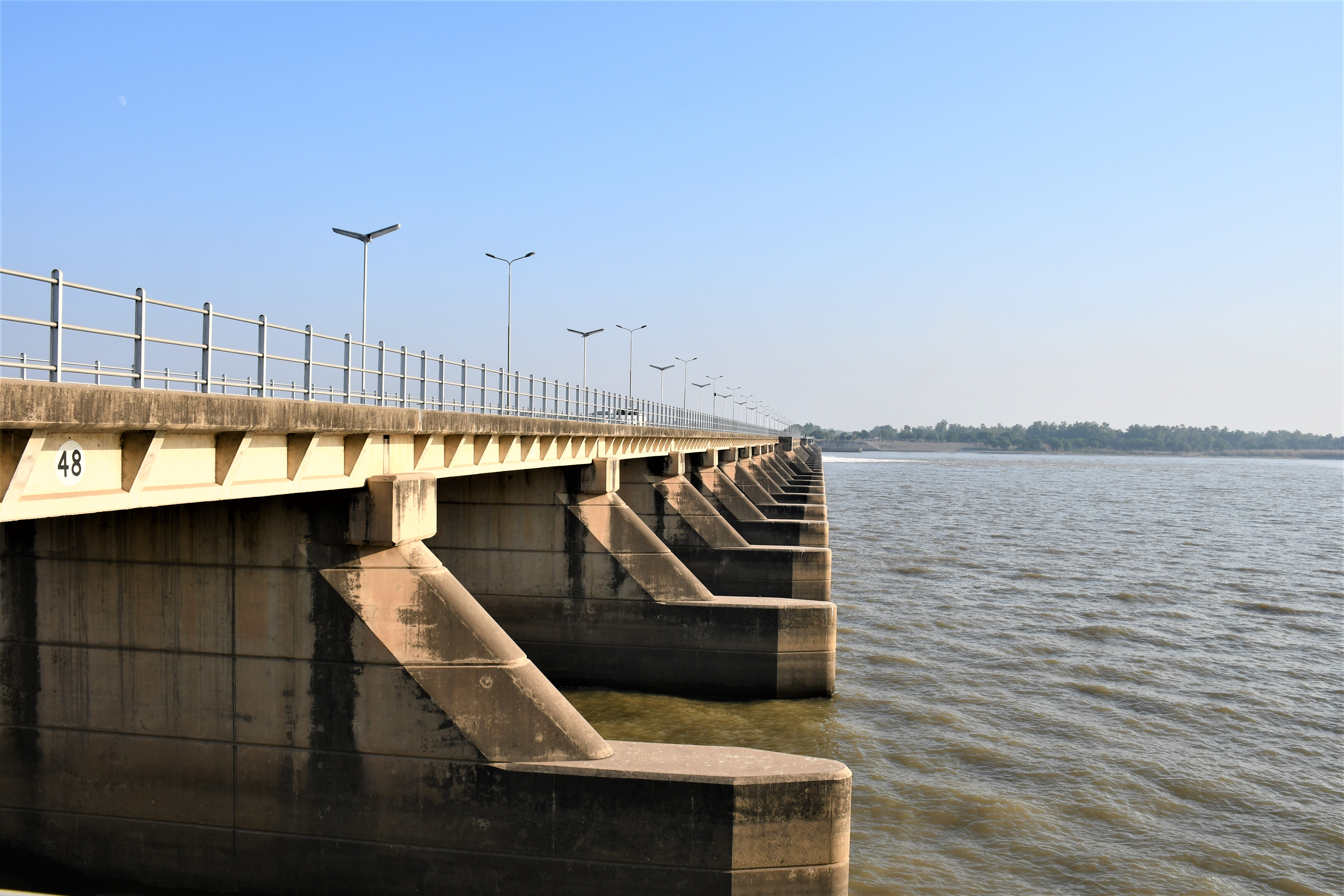
Rasul Barrage at River Jhelum

- Gurudwara Bhai Bannu at Mangat, Distt Mandi Bahauddin
- Mian Waheed-Uddin Park
- Canal View Public Park
