= Mandi Bahauddin District =

District in Punjab, Pakistan

Mandi Bahauddin District ضلع منڈی بہاؤالدین
- District of Punjab
- Mandi Bahauddin City
- Map of Punjab with Mandi-Bahauddin District highlighted
- Coordinates: 32°35′N 73°30′E
- Country: Pakistan
- Province: Punjab
- Division: Gujrat
- Established: 1 July 1993; 33 years ago
- Headquarters: Mandi Bahauddin

Government
  - Type: District Administration
  - Deputy Commissioner: Adeel Haider Baryar (PAS)
  - District Police Officer: Kamran Khan (PSP)
  - Addl. Deputy Commissioner (Rev): Jaffar Ch.

Area
  - District of Punjab: 2,673 km^{2} (1,032 sq mi)

Population (2023)
  - District of Punjab: 1,829,486
  - Density: 684.4/km^{2} (1,773/sq mi)
  - Urban: 346,141 (18.92%)
  - Rural: 1,483,345 (81.08%)

Literacy
  - Literacy rate: Total: (70.27%); Male: (74.89%); Female: (65.70%)
- Time zone: UTC+5 (PST)
- Area code: 0546
- Number of Tehsils: 3
- Website: mandibahauddin.punjab.gov.pk

Mandi Bahauddin (Punjabi and Urdu: ضلع منڈی بہاؤالدین) is a district in the Punjab province of Pakistan.

Located in central Punjab, the district is bordered on the northwest by the Jhelum River, on the southeast by the Chenab River (which separates it from Gujranwala and Gujrat districts), and on the southwest by Sargodha District. The district has an area of 2,673 square kilometres (1,032 mi^{2}). Mandi district currently has a population of 1.5 million people, according to the 2023 census. In 1998, it had a population of 1.16 million people.

== Administration ==
Mandi Bahauddin is subdivided into three tehsils and 80 union councils:

#	Tehsils	Area (km^{2})	Pop. (2023)	Density (ppl/km^{2}) (2023)	Lit. rate (2023)	Union Councils
1	Mandi Bahauddin	759	764,532	1,007.29	72.69%	30
2	Malakwal	759	429,303	565.62	66.28%	20
3	Phalia	1,155	635,651	550.35	70.11%	30

== Geography ==
The district forms a central portion of the Chaj Doab lying between the Jhelum and Chenab rivers. It lies from 30° 8' to 32° 40' N and 73° 36' to 73° 37' E. The tehsil headquarters towns of Phalia and Malikwal are 22.5 and 28.5 kilometres (14.0 and 17.7 mi) from Mandi Bahauddin, respectively. It is bounded in the north by the Jhelum river, which separates it from Jhelum district; on the west by Sargodha district, on the south by the river Chenab (which separates it from the Gujranwala and Hafizabad districts); and on the east by Gujrat district. The total area of the district is 2,673 square kilometres (1,032 sq mi). The district comprises the Mandi Bahauddin, Phalia, and Malakwal tehsils.

== Demographics ==
Historical population
Year	Pop.	±% p.a.
1951	414,850	—
1961	490,967	+1.70%
1972	721,833	+3.57%
1981	846,114	+1.78%
1998	1,160,552	+1.88%
2017	1,594,039	+1.68%
2023	1,829,486	+2.32%

As of the 2023 census, Mandi Bahauddin district has 285,989 households and a population of 1,829,486. The district has a sex ratio of 100.54 males to 100 females and a literacy rate of 70.27%: 74.89% for males and 65.70% for females. 457,547 (25.01% of the surveyed population) are under 10 years of age. 346,141 (18.92%) live in urban areas.

Religion in Mandi Bahauddin district (2023)
Religion	Percent
Islam	99.40%
Christianity	0.52%
Other or not stated	0.08%

Religion in contemporary Mandi Bahauddin District
Religious group	1941		2017		2023	
Religious group	Pop.	%	Pop.	%	Pop.	%
Islam	322,707	81.06%	1,587,248	99.57%	1,818,188	99.40%
Hinduism	38,843	9.76%	357	0.02%	326	0.02%
Sikhism	34,178	8.59%	—N/a	—N/a	15	~0%
Christianity	2,321	0.58%	4,939	0.31%	9,467	0.52%
Ahmadi	—N/a	—N/a	1,438	0.09%	1,123	0.06%
Others	38	0.01%	57	0.01%	33	~0%
Total Population	398,087	100%	1,594,039	100%	1,829,152	100%
Note: 1941 census data is for Phalia tehsil of erstwhile Gujrat district, which roughly corresponds to contemporary Mandi Bahauddin District. District and tehsil borders have changed since 1941.

Languages of Mandi Bahauddin district (2023)
1. Punjabi (93.2%)
2. Urdu (4.57%)
3. Pashto (1.77%)
4. Others (0.46%)

At the time of the 2023 census 93.2% of the population spoke Punjabi, 4.57% Urdu and 1.77% Pashto as their first language. The dialect of Punjabi spoken here is Jatki which is close to the standard language.

According to the 1998 Pakistan census, the population of the district was 1,160,552, 14.93% of whom lived in urban environments.

== Climate ==
This district has a moderate climate, hot in summer and cold in winter. During the peak of summer the temperature may rise to 48 °C (118 °F) during the day, but in the winter months the minimum temperature may fall below 3 °C (37 °F). The average rainfall in the district is 388 millimetres (15.3 in). This mainly resonates with weather from Islamabad.

== Notable people ==
- Hasan Ali, cricketer, Pakistan National Cricket team
- Shaukat Ali, folk singer
- Naved Arif, Pakistani cricketer
- Asif Bashir Bhagat, former Member Provincial Assembly of Punjab (MPA).
- Muhammad Khan Bhatti, former Provincial Secretary Provincial Assembly of the Punjab
- Imdad Ullah Bosal, Federal Secretary Finance of Pakistan
- Nasir Iqbal Bosal, member National Assembly of Pakistan (MNA)
- Nadeem Afzal Chan, former MNA Member National Assembly of Pakistan (PPP, Ex PTI)
- Imtiaz Ahmed Chaudhary, MNA PTI
- Basma Riaz Choudhry, MPA Member Provincial Assembly of Punjab (PTI)(Ex-PML-Q)
- Nazar Muhammad Gondal, MNA former Federal Minister for Capital Administration & Development
- Pervaiz Mehdi Qureshi, former Chief of Pakistan Air Force
- Khalid Mahmood Ranjha, MPA Parliamentary secretary for Law & Parliamentary Affairs (PMLN), Ranjha family of Kot Sher Muhammad
- Hasan Askari Rizvi, Chief Minister Punjab (Caretaker)
- Muhammad Binyamin Rizvi, former Minister of Social Welfare, Women Development and Bait-ul-Maal. Advisor to the Chief Minister of Punjab. Member Provincial Assembly of Punjab (MPA)
- Syed Tariq Yaqoob Rizvi, former Member of the Provincial Assembly of the Punjab (MPA), former Chief Officer and Deputy Director in Local Government & Community Development Department
- Mohammad Yaqoob Shah, religious scholar, former (MPA) Member Provincial Assembly of Punjab, Advisor to the Chief Minister of Punjab
- Muhammad Tariq Tarar, former M.N.A (PTI, Ex PPP)
- Mumtaz Ahmed Tarar, former MNA Federal Minister of Human Rights (PML-N, Ex PPP)
- Mustansar Hussain Tarar, Pakistani novelist, columnist, travel writer and TV host
- Hameeda Waheeduddin, MPA Minister of Women Development Punjab (PML-N, Ex PLM-Q)

== See also ==
- Divisions of Pakistan
- Tehsils of Pakistan
  - Tehsils of Punjab, Pakistan
  - Tehsils of Khyber Pakhtunkhwa, Pakistan
  - Tehsils of Balochistan, Pakistan
  - Tehsils of Sindh, Pakistan
  - Tehsils of Azad Kashmir
  - Tehsils of Gilgit-Baltistan
- District
  - Districts of Khyber Pakhtunkhwa, Pakistan
  - Districts of Punjab, Pakistan
  - Districts of Balochistan, Pakistan
  - Districts of Sindh, Pakistan
  - Districts of Azad Kashmir
  - Districts of Gilgit-Baltistan
