= Jirair =

Jirair or Jirayr (Armenian: Ժիրայր) is an Armenian masculine given name. It is also spelt Zhirayr. The name may refer to:

- Zhirayr Agavelyan (born 1955), Armenian TV personality, writer and artist
- Zhirayr Ananyan (1934–2004), Armenian playwright
- Zhirayr Hovhannisyan (born 1981), Armenian wrestler
- Jirair Hovnanian (1927–2007), American home builder
- Zhirayr Margaryan (born 1997), Armenian football player
- Jirayr Ohanyan Çakır (1923–2003), Turkish Armenian chess player, coach, and former president of the Turkish Chess Federation
- Zhirayr Poghosyan (born 1942), Armenian politician
- Jirair Ratevosian (born 1981), American policy advisor
- Jirair Sefilian (born 1967), Lebanese-born Armenian military commander and political activist
- Zhirayr Shaghoyan (born 2001), Armenian footballer
- Jirayr Zorthian (1911–2004), Armenian American artist

== Middle name ==
- Gerard Jirair Libaridian (born 1945), Armenian-American historian and politician
- Gerard Jirayr Svazlian, Armenian violinist
