= Armine Nalbandyan =

Armenian actress, theatre director, playwright and lecturer

- Nalbandyan in her youth
- Born: Armine Varazdati Nalbandyan; 10 September 1958 (age 68); Yerevan, Armenian SSR, Soviet Union
- Education: Armenian State Pedagogical University
- Occupations: Actress; theatre director; playwright; screenwriter; lecturer
- Years active: 1979–present

Armine Varazdati Nalbandyan (Armenian: Արմինե Վարազդատի Նալբանդյան; born 10 September 1958) is an Armenian actress, theatre director, playwright, screenwriter and university lecturer.

== Early life and education ==
Nalbandyan was born on 10 September 1958 in Yerevan, Armenian SSR. Between 1976 and 1979, she studied at the film and theatre studio affiliated with the Hamo Beknazarian Film Studio, qualifying as a film and theatre actress. From 1987 to 1991, she studied directing at the Faculty of Culture of the Armenian State Pedagogical University, in the workshop of film director Henrik Malyan, qualifying as a film and theatre director.

== Career ==
=== Theatre and television ===
Nalbandyan began her stage career as an actress at the Yerevan State Pantomime Theatre from 1980 to 1987. Between 1999 and 2014, she collaborated as an actress with the Nork Youth Theatre.

In 1997, she worked on the television programme Rio-de on AR TV. From 1997 to 1999, she worked as a screenwriter and director for sketches on the Artakarg Aliq programme on the Public Television Company of Armenia. In 1999, she wrote short pieces for Shoghakat TV. Between 1999 and 2001, she worked at Armenia TV as a speech coach for television presenters and as a broadcast director for the programme Ory.

From 2002 to 2021, Nalbandyan collaborated with Kentron TV, writing and directing children's and cultural programmes, including Khzdzikn u Jnjulik, Cupidon, and Tiezerqy Api Mej. Between 2002 and 2005, within the framework of United Nations grant programmes, she wrote the scripts for the radio drama series Arevatsagy 6-ants Kesin and Anhasce Taghamas.

=== Teaching ===
Nalbandyan has been teaching since 1991. She taught in the Directing Department of the Armenian State Pedagogical University for five years. Since 2014, she has conducted speech training courses at the Panarmenian Media School. In 2021, she began teaching at the Media Academy of the Public Television Company of Armenia, the Faculty of Journalism at Yerevan State University, and the Department of Sports Management and Sports Journalism at the Armenian State Institute of Physical Culture and Sport.

== Playwriting ==
Nalbandyan's plays have been published in the Armenian literary and arts journals Garun, Dramaturgia, and Arvest. Her plays include:

- Tkats (Don't Care)
- Izheri Tsnundy (The Birth of Vipers)
- Inch Ka Mtqid (What's on Your Mind)
- Kintavr
- Hog Che (Never Mind)
- Nakherganq (Prelude)
- Verjin Gisher (The Last Night)
- Verjin Momy (The Last Candle)

In 2005, her book containing the scripts for the radio series Anhasce Taghamas was published under a United Nations grant programme.
