= Zhirayr Ananyan =

Armenian playwright

- Born: July 14, 1934; Berd, Armenian SSR, Soviet Union
- Died: April 24, 2004 (aged 69); Yerevan, Armenia
- Occupation: playwright

Zhirayr Hrayri Ananyan (Ter-Ananyan) (also Jirair, Armenian: Ժիրայր Հրայրի Անանյան (Տեր-Անանյան), July 14, 1934 – April 24, 2004) was an Armenian playwright. He is the author of the comedy play Taxi, Taxi (1973), one of the most popular plays in Armenia since it was written. During one season it was staged in Soviet theatres more than 100 times.

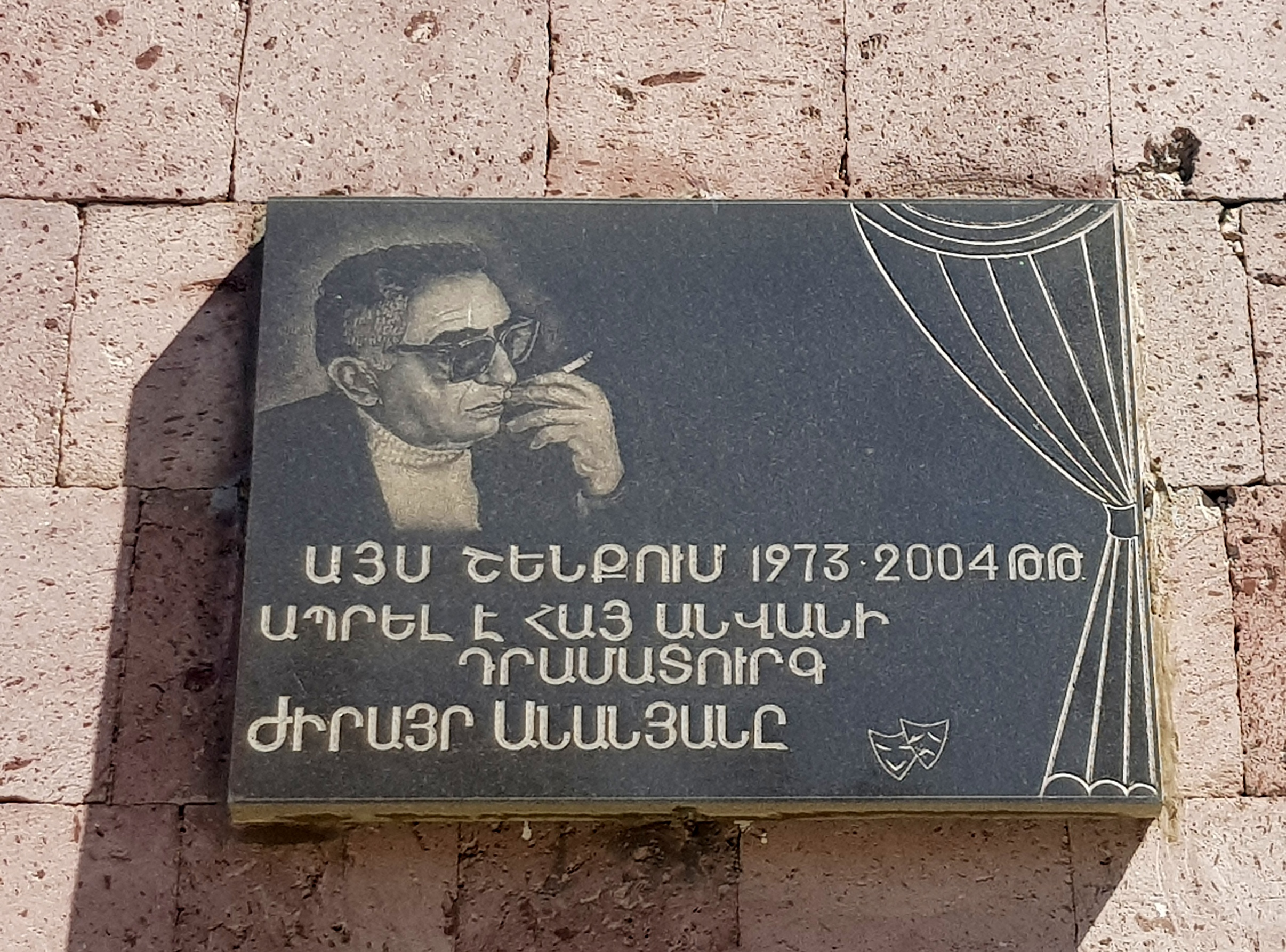
Jirayr Ananyan's memorial plaque in Yerevan

== Biography ==
Ananyan studied at the Yerevan School after Mikayel Nalbandyan. He graduated from the historical-philological faculty of Yerevan State Pedagogical University in 1958. From 1959 to 1980, he worked at the Armenian State TV and Radio Committee. Ananyan's first play, Diplomi hamar (For a Diploma) was staged in 1956. His plays Antsanot’ amusinner (Unfamiliar Spouses), Im tunë k’o tunë ch’e (My Home is Not Your Home), Karusel (Carousel), Tr’ch’ogh ap’seits’ ijats mardë (The Man from the Flying Saucer), Bravo, and Taxi, Taxi (with Karp Khachvankyan as Knyaz and Svetlana Grigoryan as Roz) others were staged at the Yerevan Sundukian Theatre and Paronian Theatre of Comedy.

He is one of the most popular Armenian playwrights, whose plays have been translated into many languages and staged in different countries, including the United States, Iran, Lebanon and others. He became a member of the USSR Union of Writers in 1980. In 2002, he was awarded with the "Vahagn" all-Armenian prize.

== Books ==
- Tak'si, tak'si: piesner Տաքսի, տաքսի: պիեսներ [Taxi, Taxi: Plays] (in Armenian). Yerevan: Sovetakan grogh. 1987.
- Tr'ch'ogh ap'seits' ijats mardë (piesner) Թռչող ափսեից իջած մարդը։ պիեսներ [The Man from the Flying Saucer]. Yerevan: Anahit. 1992.
