= Artavazd Awards =

Annual theatre awards in Armenia

- Native name: Արտավազդ թատերական մրցանակաբաշխություն
- Awarded for: Excellence and outstanding achievement
- Date: 2002
- Location: Paronyan Musical Comedy Theatre
- Country: Armenia
- Presented by: Union of Theatrical Figures of Armenia

Television/radio coverage
- Network: AMPTV

Artavazd Awards (Armenian: Արտավազդ մրցանակաբաշխություն; trans: Artavazd mrcanakabashkhutiun) is an annual awards ceremony first held in Yerevan, Armenia in 2002. The awards, which are presented for excellence and outstanding achievement in theatre, are named after the Armenian King Artavasdes and coincide with World Theatre Day.

The awards were created and are sponsored by the Union of Theatrical Figures of Armenia to appreciate and spur the activities of individuals and creators of theatrical performances. The awards consist of 13 categories. Each year, the award ceremony airs live on the Public Television Company of Armenia.
