= Yerevan Circus =

Circus building in Yerevan, Armenia

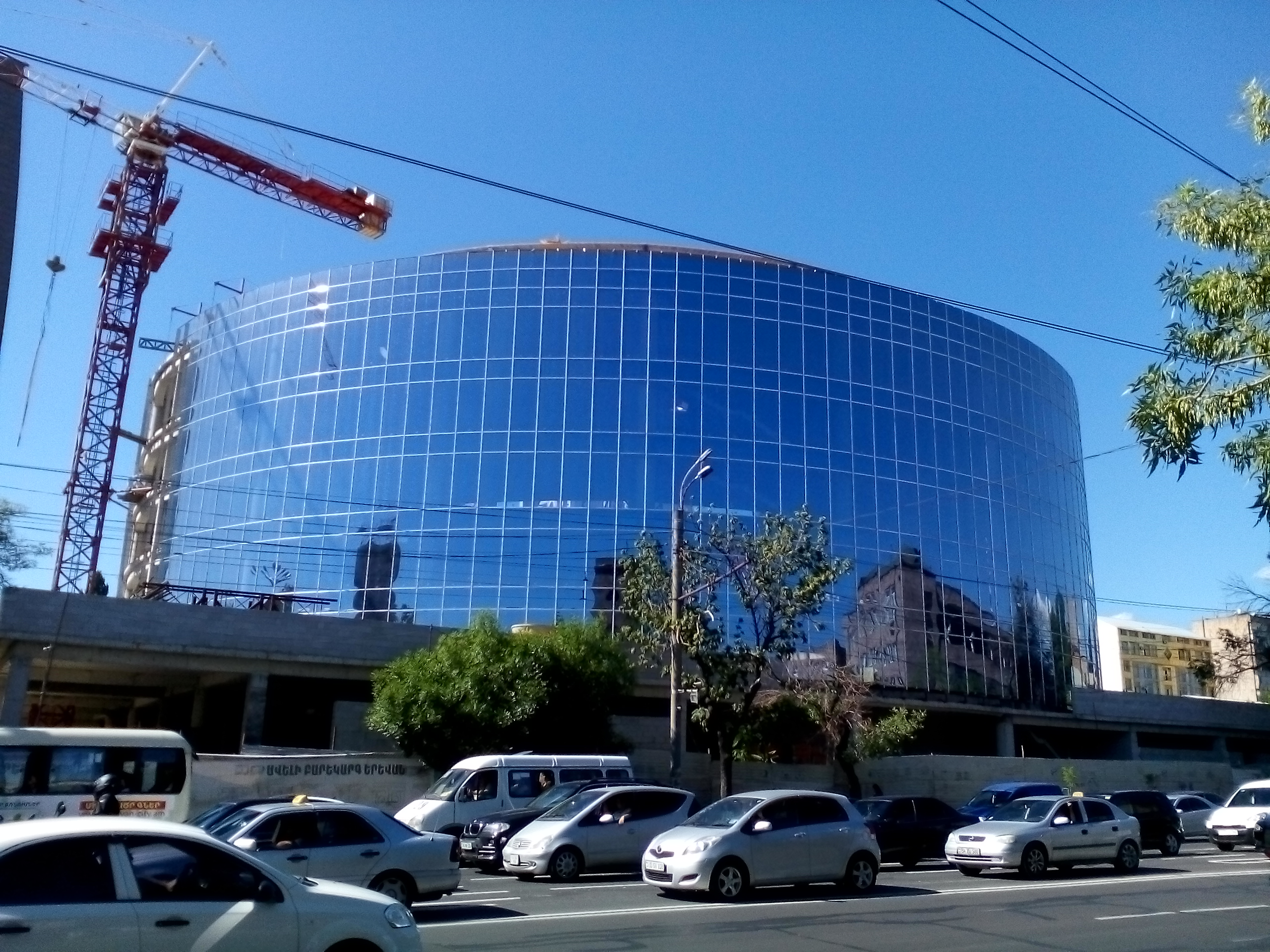
The new Yerevan Circus in 2017

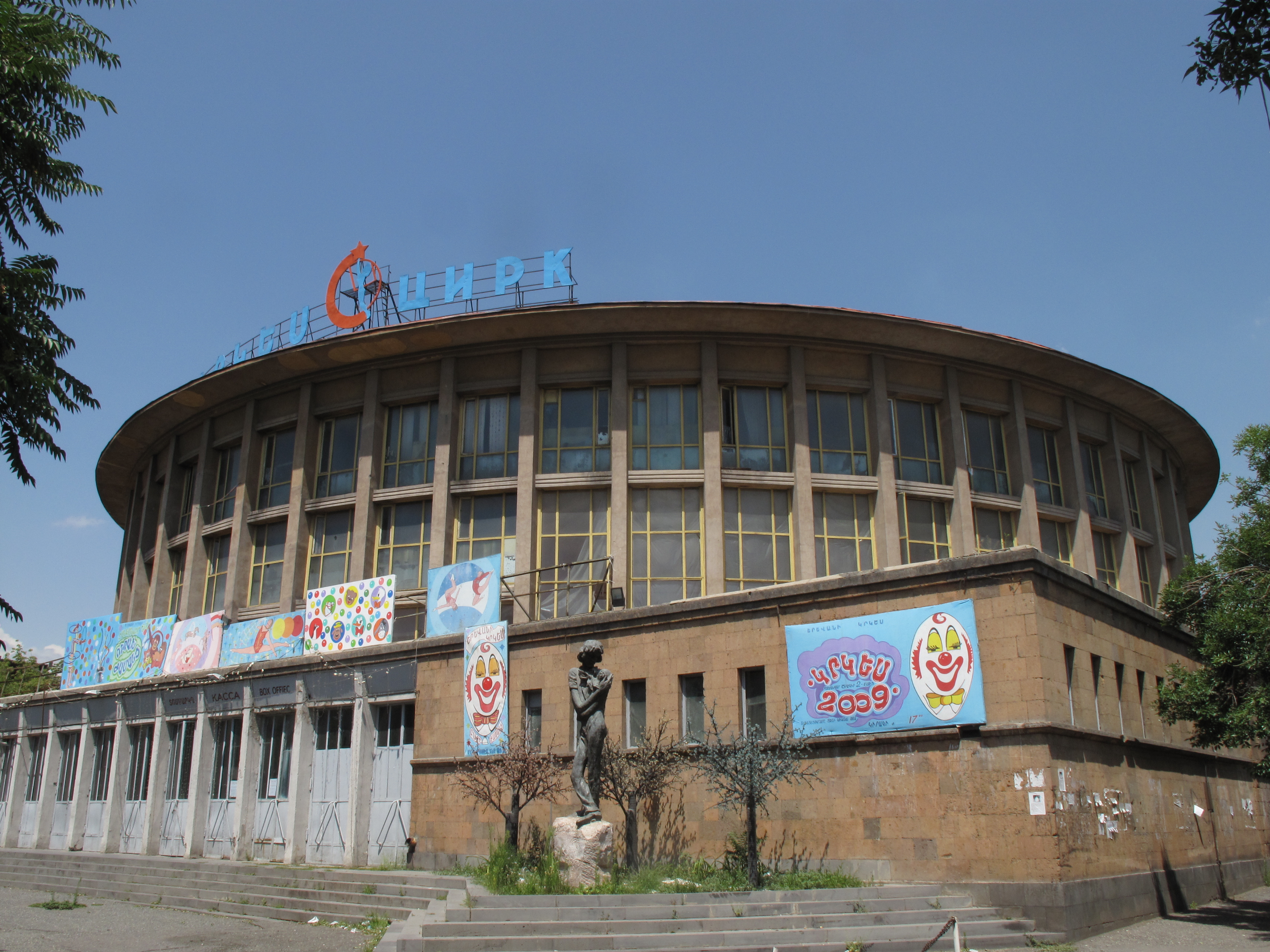
The old Yerevan Circus in 2009

The Yerevan Circus (Armenian: Երևանի կրկես Yerevani krkes) is a circus founded in the 1930s. It was completely renovated in 1962 and was finally demolished in September 2012. The new building of the circus was planned to be opened in October 2017.

== History ==
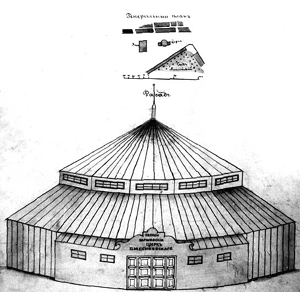
The original circus building

External videos
- Demolition of the roof, 21 July 2012
- Complete demolition, 8 September 2012

The original building of the circus was wooden and was built in the 1930s. In 1939, a new building was constructed in its location for 800 spectators designed by Nikoghayos Buniatian. That building was completely renovated in 1962 by Vagharshak Belubekian's project. Its capacity decreased to 700. The building has not been renovated since then.

=== Renovation ===
Yerevan Circus was privatized in August 2005 and was bought by the circus staff led by Sos Petrosyan for AMD 150 million In 2011, Moscow-based Armenian businessman Samvel Karapetyan's announced that his Tashir Group would invest $10 million in the renovation of the Yerevan Circus.

The repair works were started in August 2011 by Tashir Group. Later it was decided to demolish the building and construct a new one, because the old building was not eligible for renovation. The roof of the circus building was demolished on July 21, 2012. Few months later on September 8, 2012, the whole building was demolished. The Armenian Ministry of Emergency Situations supervised the demolition process.

The circus animals are now temporarily located at the Yerevan Zoo.

The new building can house 1,700 to 2,000 spectators. A new underground parking lot is also being built. The construction is planned to be finished in 2014.

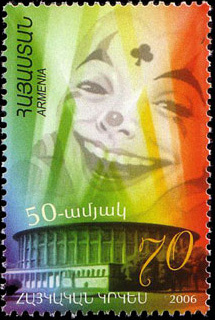
2007 stamp for the 50th anniversary of Armenian circus

== In popular culture ==
Numerous scenes of the 1963 Soviet film Road to the Stage by Henrik Malyan were shot in the circus building, featuring prominent Armenian clown Leonid Yengibarov.
