= Ananyan =

Ananyan (Armenian: Անանյան), also transliterated as Ananian, is a surname of Armenian origin. Notable people with the surname include:

- Jemma Ananyan (1931–2018), Armenian politician
- Levon Ananyan (1946–2013), Armenian journalist and translator
- Vakhtang Ananyan (1905–1980), Armenian writer
- Zhirayr Ananyan (1934–2004), Armenian playwright
