= Zhirayr Agavelyan =

Armenian TV director

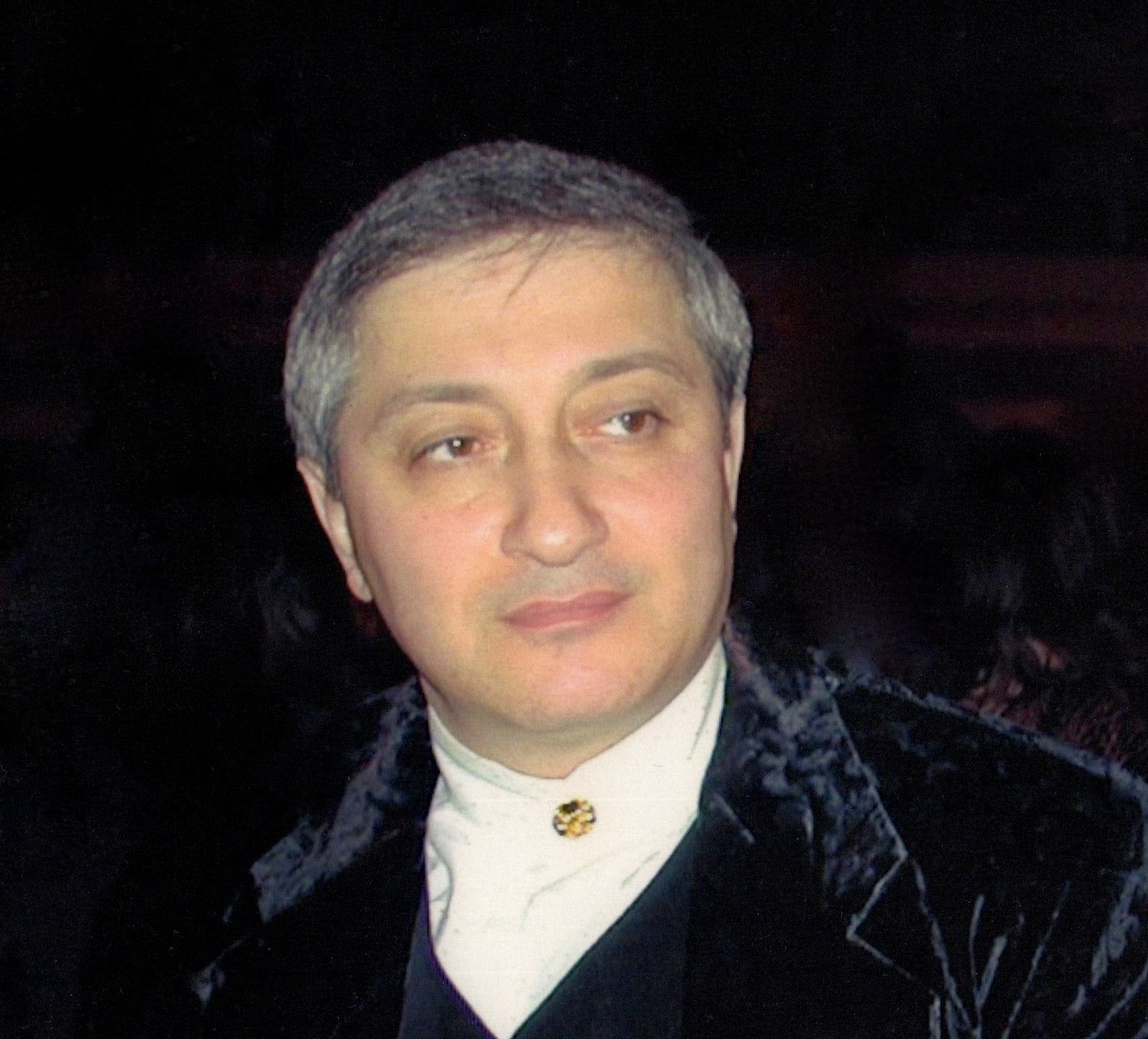
- Born: December 8, 1955 (age 70); Yerevan
- Education: Saint Petersburg State University of Culture and Arts, Russia
- Occupations: director, painter, writer, actor, screenwriter, musician

Zhirayr Agavelyan (born December 8, 1955, Yerevan), is an Armenian TV director, artist, actor, writer, TV scenarist, musician, and member of Artists’ Union of Armenia (2015).

== Biography ==
Zhirayr Agavelyan was born in 1955 in Yerevan, Armenia. In 1972 he graduated from Hagop Baronian school #59 in Yerevan. 1973-1977 studied and graduated from Echmiadzin college TV department in Armenia. 1975-1977 served in the army (Germany) . 1977- 1980 graduated from "Armenfilm" studio, with the qualification of actor for TV and theatre. 1977-1991 he worked as a TV director in the Armenian Public TV/1TV in Yerevan. 1984-1989 studied and graduated from St. Petersburg Culture Institute TV department in Russia. In 1991 left for United States of America. In 2012 he returned Armenia.

He began working with photo art in 2009. He has had many exhibitions not only in the homeland, but also abroad.

"Since I am a TV director by profession, I decided to turn photography into a movement and give it a spirituaal, philosophical life. It became the beginning and the color search called photo navigation. Later, the inner instinct opened a new way to photography. "

== Books ==
He has published three books:

- "Take Me in Your Hands" (published by Gasprint Publishing House, 2012),
- "Miniatures of thought" (philosophical aphorisms, Yerevan Author Publishing House, 2013),
- "Three ages" autobiographical novel with photo art pictures (Lusakn Publishing House, 2015).
- The Light of the Shadow 2023
- The Paintings Ponder 2025
- The Lanterns

== Photo directing-photo art gallery ==
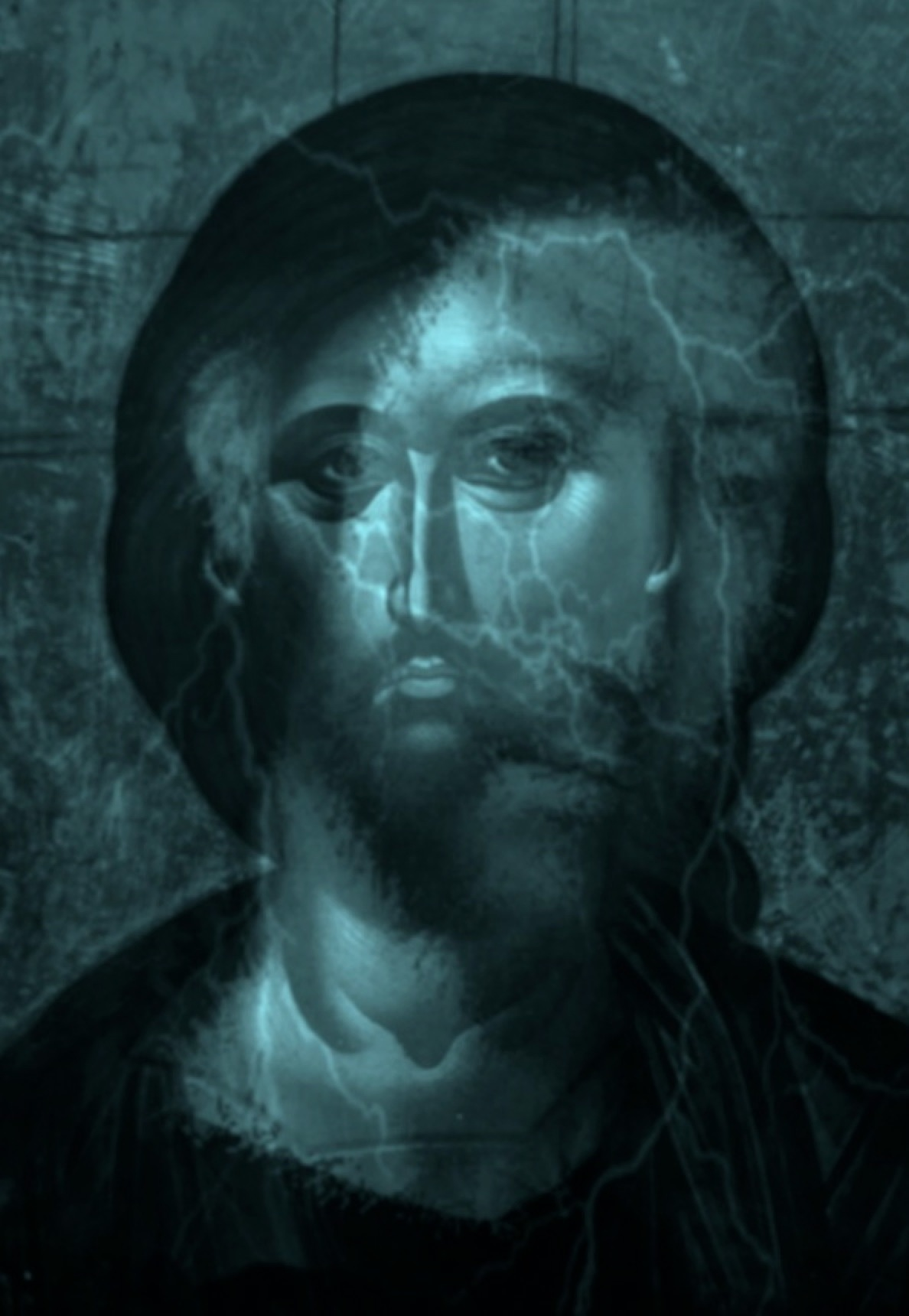

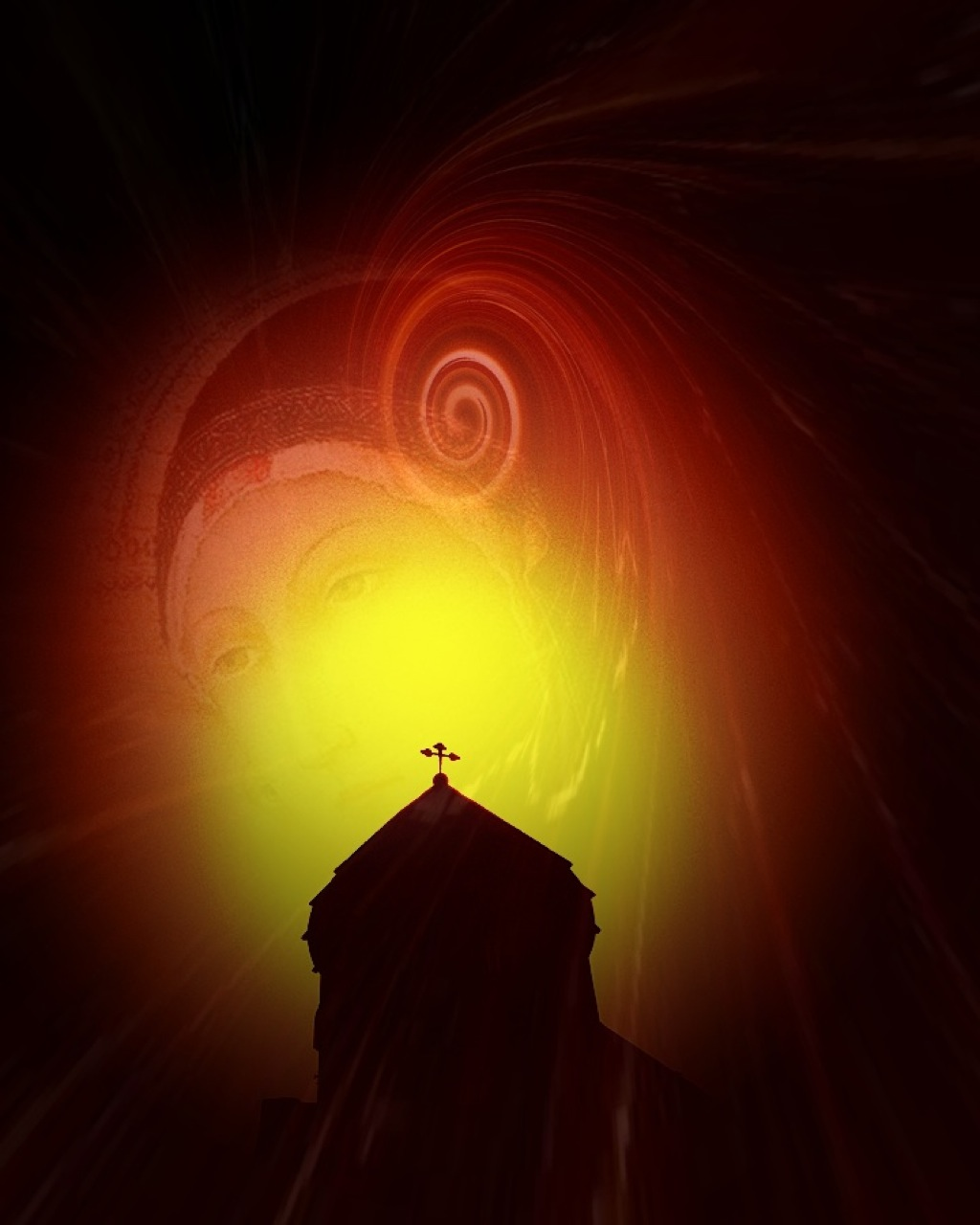

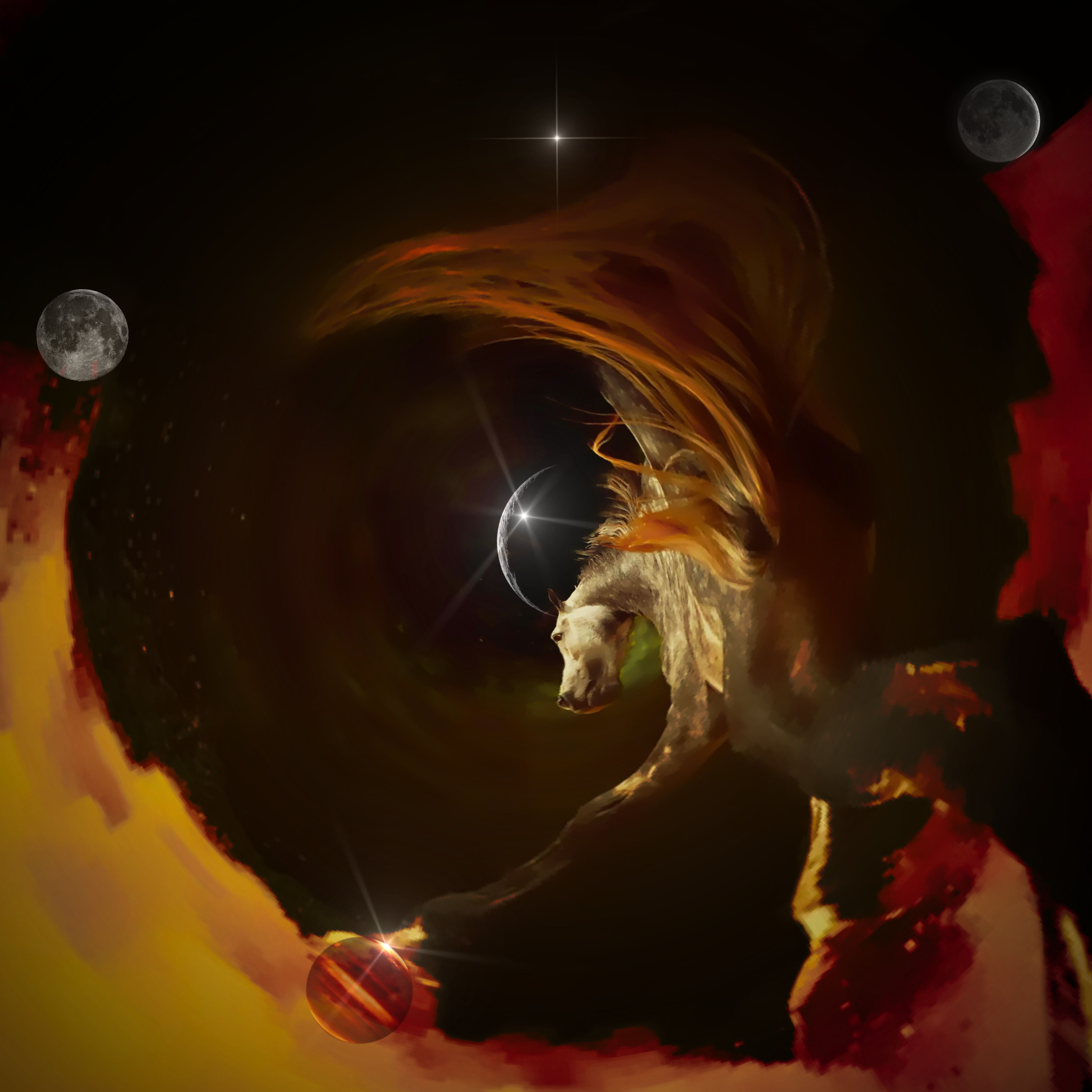

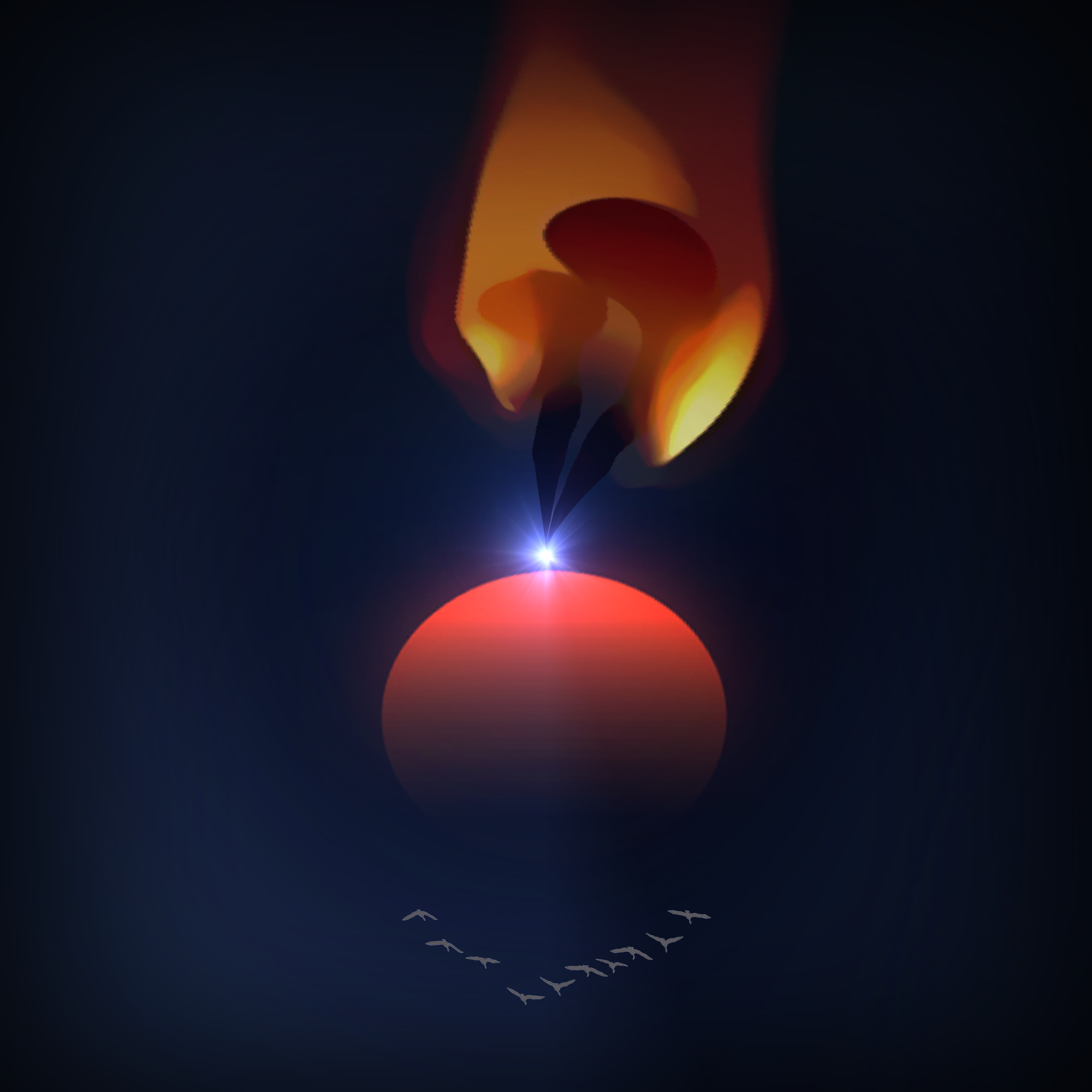

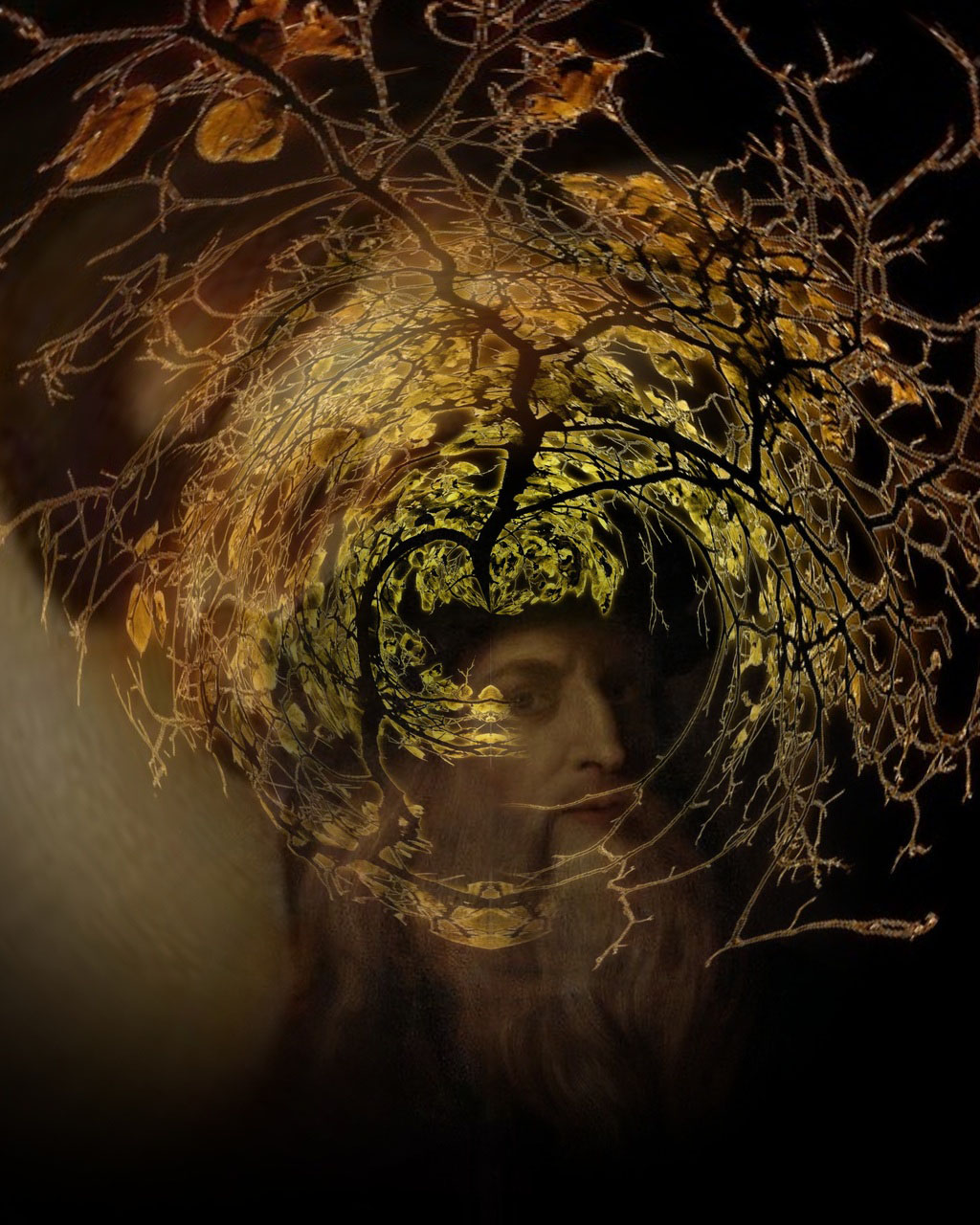

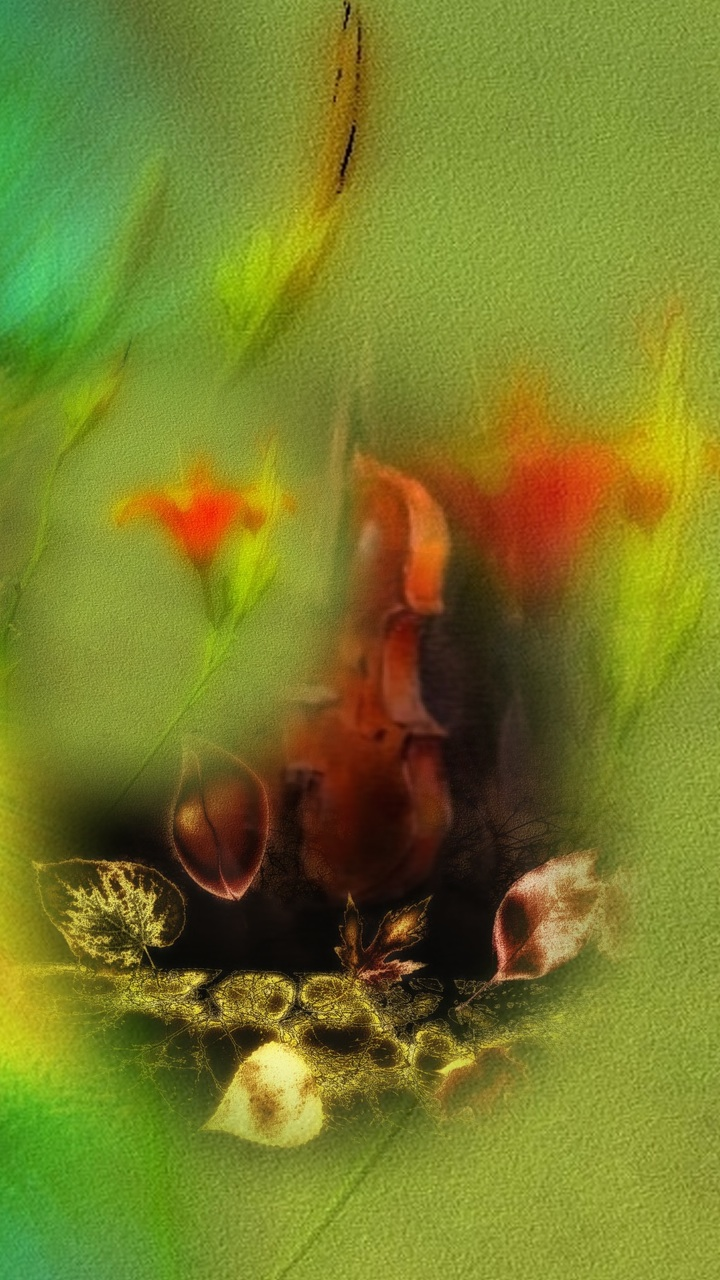

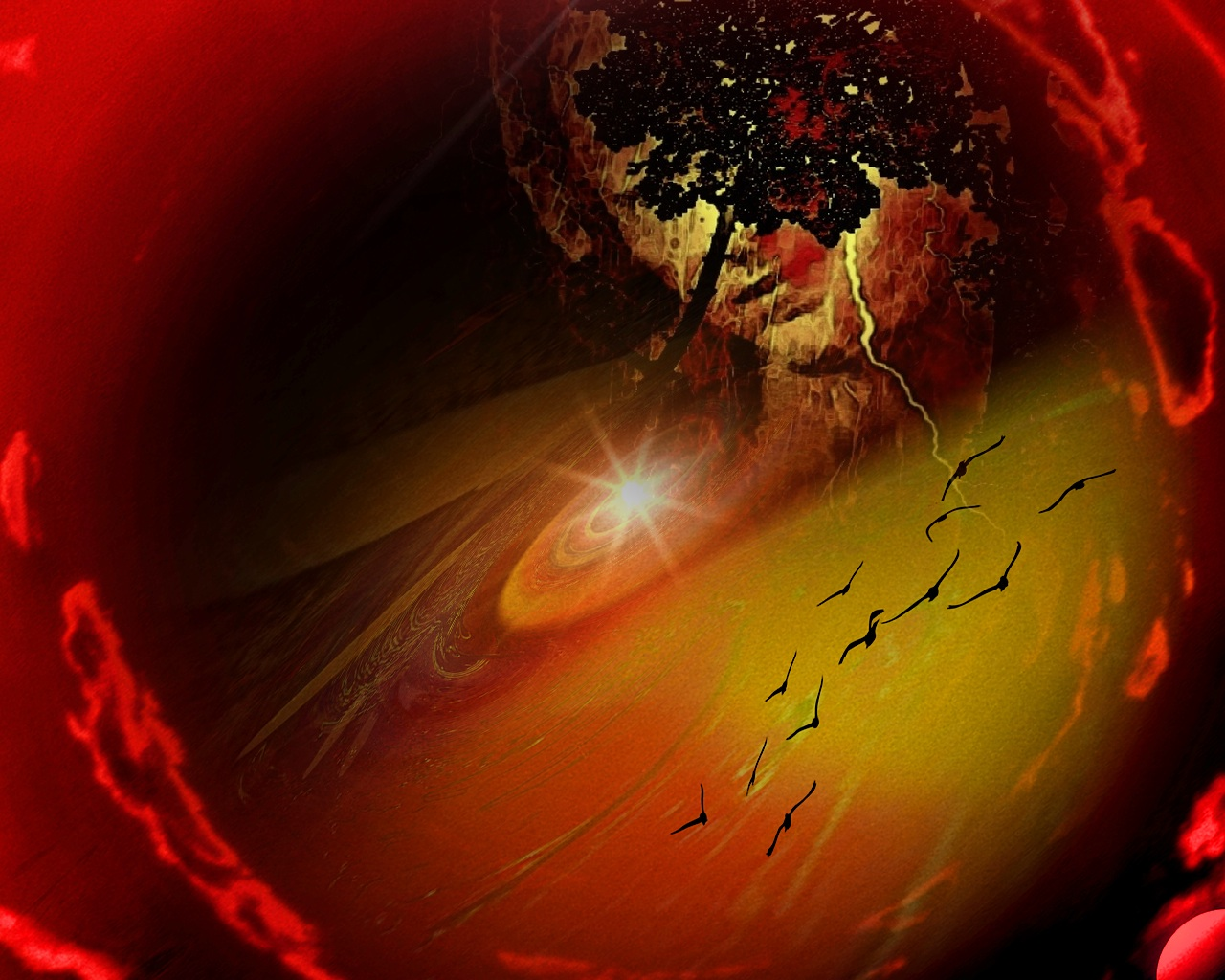

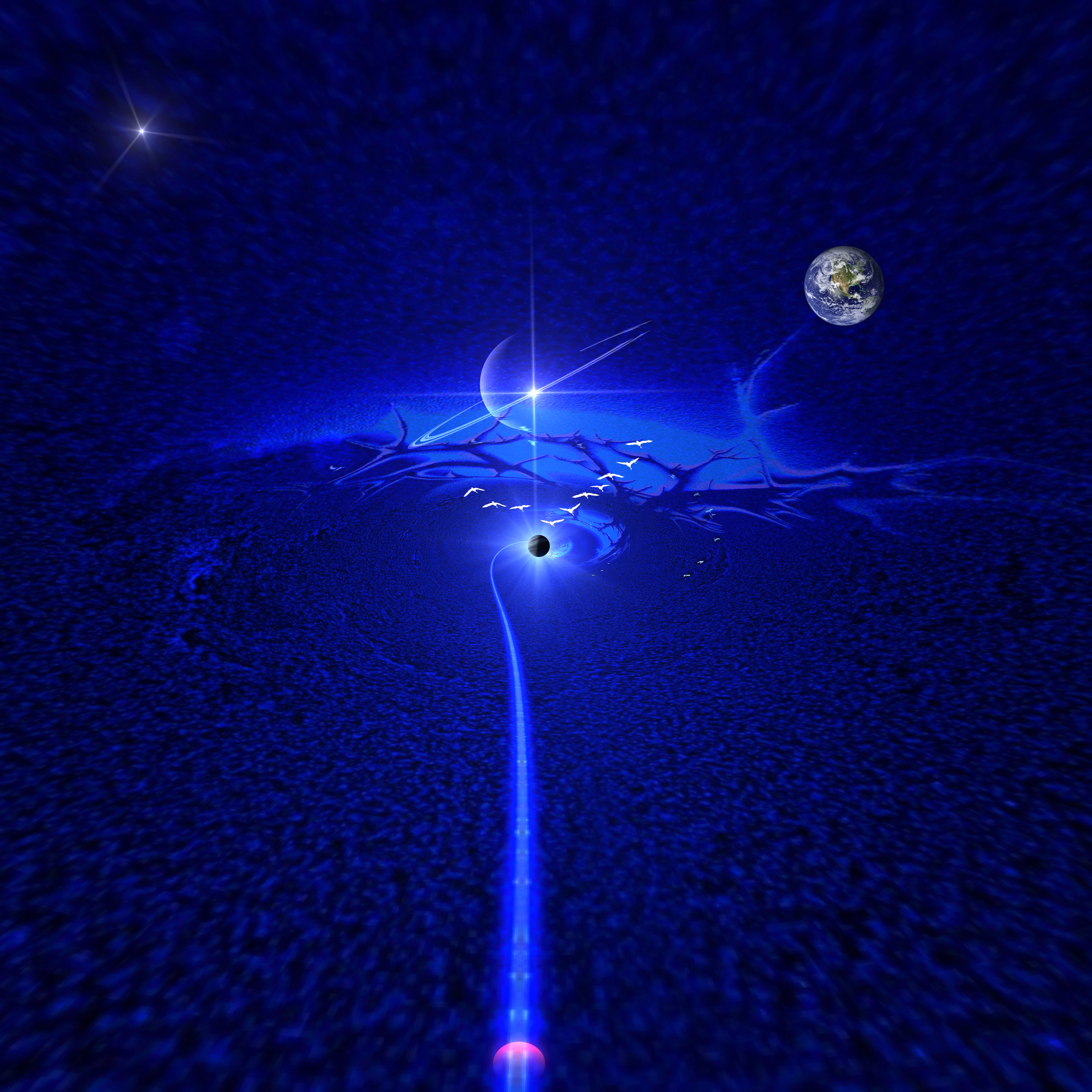

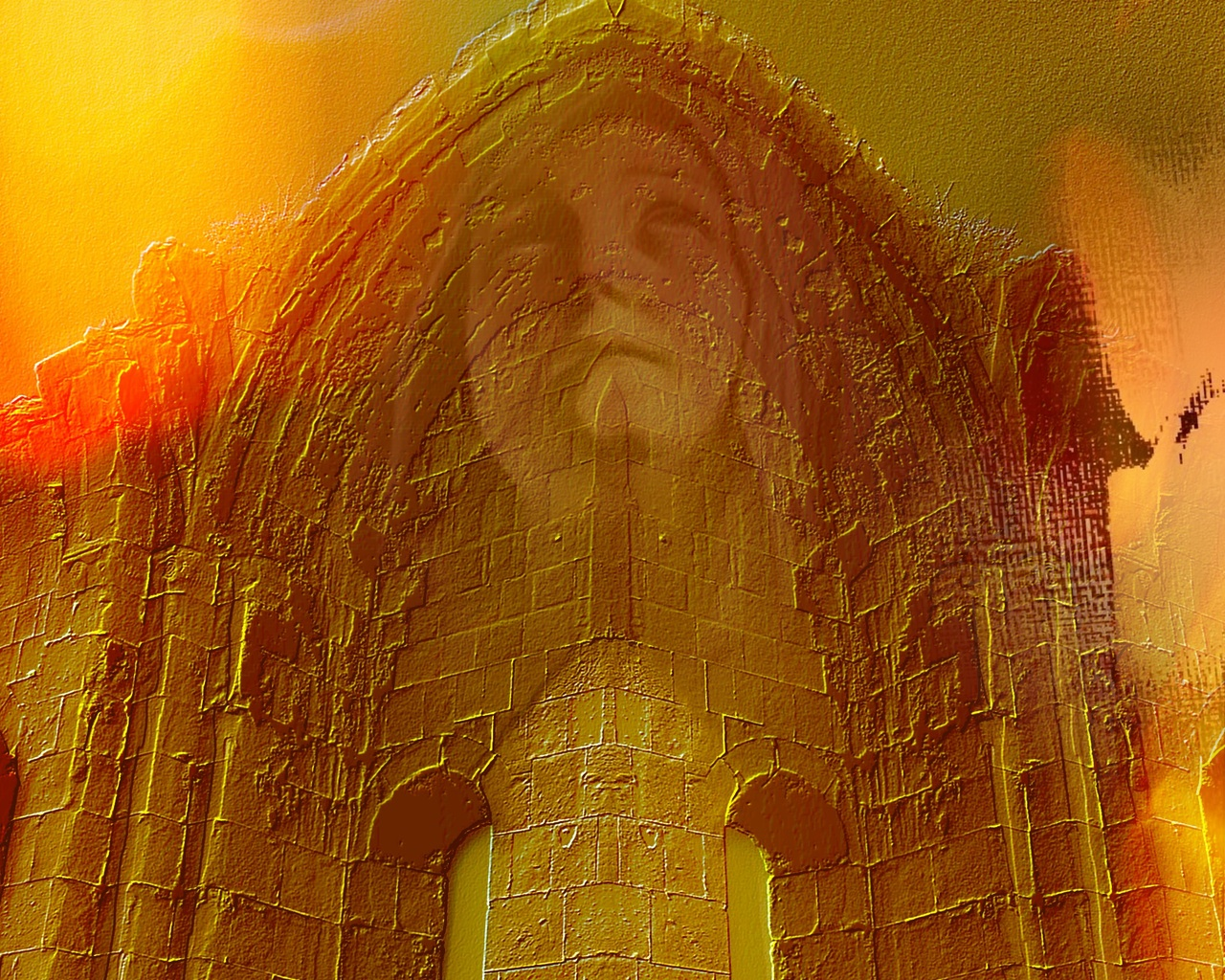

== Shots from exhibitions ==
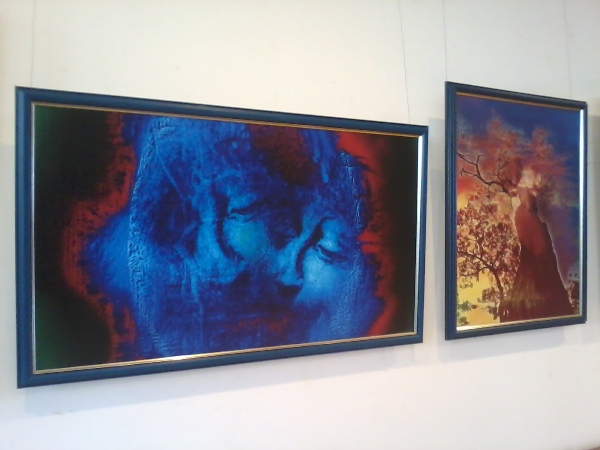

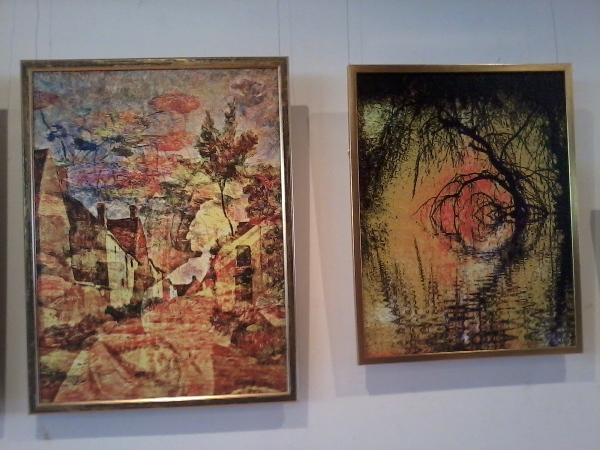

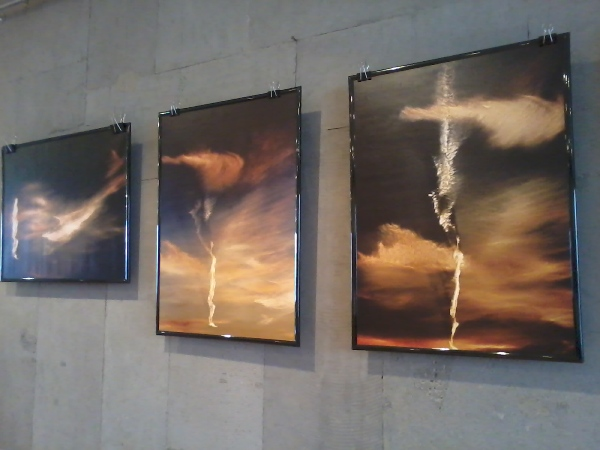

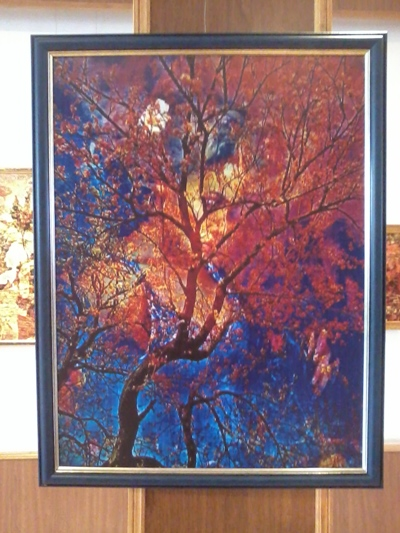
