= Rima Khachatryan =

Armenian innovator and chemist

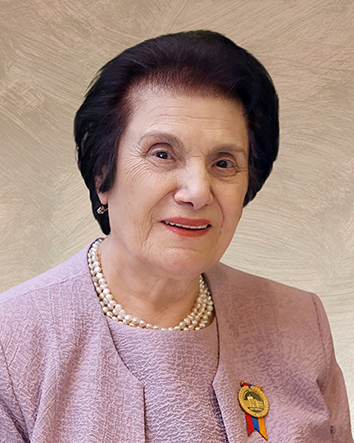
- Born: April 3, 1938; Yerevan, Armenia
- Died: April 10, 2020 (aged 82); Yerevan, Armenia
- Occupations: Educator, an Honored Pedagogue of Armenia
- Years active: 1965–2020
- Known for: Enhancing nurse education in Armenia, introducing a new educational module aimed at learning outcomes.
- Notable work: Inorganic Chemistry: Textbook for medical colleges (vol. I & II), Analytical Chemistry: Textbook for medical colleges

Rima Khachatryan (April 3, 1938 – April 10, 2020) was an Armenian educator, chemist, educational innovator, Honored Pedagogue of Armenia and author of textbooks for medical colleges.

She is known for her efforts to enhance nurse education in Armenia, that led to establishment of a dozen medical colleges in rural areas as well as two scientifically based nursing schools in Yerevan during 1975-2015.

In the 1990s Rima Khachatryan introduced an innovative methodology aimed at learning outcomes - Underperforming Student Success Mode. Based on four fundamental values - dignity, truthfulness, fairness, and responsibility and freedom - it was about transforming the educational experience itself and made a significant impact on educational reforms in post-soviet Armenia.

== Background and education ==
Rima Khachatryan was the youngest of three children born into a close-knit, happy family of émigrés – survivors of the Armenian genocide. Her parents - Mkhitar Khachatryan and Siranush Martirosyan - had emigrated from Alashkert and Van respectively. They sought refuge and met in an orphanage of the Near East Relief in Alexandropol.

In 1960 she graduated from the Armenian State Pedagogical University, and was qualified as a teacher of Chemistry and Biology. In 1962-1965 she attended the Armenian National Agrarian University, and in 1969 received Diploma in Chemistry from the School of Pedagogy of the National Polytechnic University of Armenia.

== Teaching and promoting nurse education ==
From September 1, 1965, until her death in 2020 - for 55 years - Rima Khachatryan taught pharmaceutical, inorganic, analytical, and organic chemistry at the Yerevan Basic Medical College (in 2002–2013 – Head of the Department of Pharmaceutics). “She believed that the purpose of education should not be reduced to the acquisition of a certain set of skills, but rather the realisation of one's potential and the ability to use those skills in the real life”, Armenian media reported in 2020.

In 1987, as a finalist of the pan-USSR socialist emulation in pedagogy, she was awarded with an Honorary Certificate for exceptional achievements by the Central Committee of the Communist Party of the Soviet Union, Council of Ministers, All-Union Central Council of Trade Unions and All-Union Leninist Young Communist League.

In 2007–2009 she authored and published two textbooks for the students of medical colleges, namely the two-volume "Inorganic Chemistry" and "Analytical Chemistry". For about one-and-a-half decades both textbooks have been the core learning resources for a dozen state medical colleges around the country.

“Their [the textbooks’] main advantage is the consistency of the instructional design and the learner-centered approach to presenting the content. Being able to apply the theoretical knowledge through the application and practice activities, the student is given a broader opportunity for self-learning", News.am stated in 2020 calling them "textbooks that are never outdated".

She led the efforts of introducing in medical colleges of Armenia the new educational program for “Pharmaceutics” discipline that attracted substantial attention of the professional pedagogical community.

== Trade union activities ==
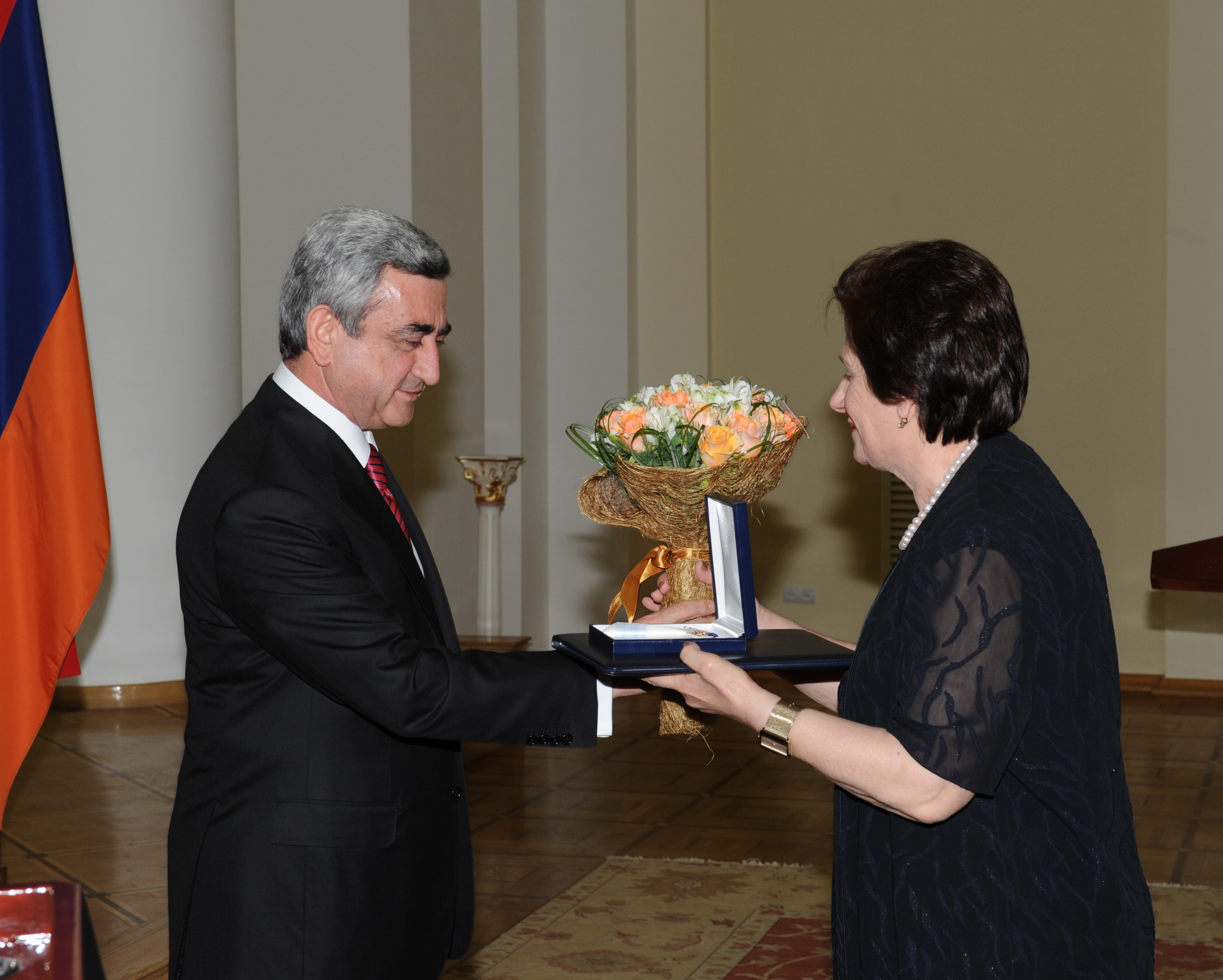
President of Armenia Serzh Sargsyan awards Rima Khachatryan with Anania Shirakatsi medal, May 27, 2009

In 1969-2020, for five decades she led the trade union of the Yerevan Basic Medical College, which media recorded as "a record leadership experience in itself". She considered "two fundamental elements – schools and civil society – to be major topics needing attention to encourage nurse education system".

During the First Nagorno-Karabakh War for the first time in Armenia the trade union she headed decided to direct all membership fees to the mutual aid fund to honour those who served and to raise money for the College's veteran students and their families.

She also significantly contributed to the elaboration of the RA Law on Medical Assistance and Service to the Population adopted in 1996, where for the first time ever "issues regarding legal regulation of nursing, assessment of the workload and fair pay of nurses and mid-level practitioners were touched upon"

== Recognition and legacy ==
=== Awards and decorations ===
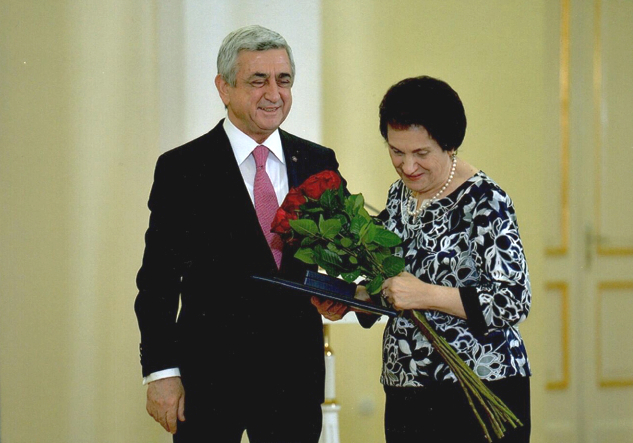
President of Armenia Serzh Sargsyan awards Rima Khachatryan with the badge of Honored Pedagogue, May 28, 2017

The Armenian government presented many decorations and awards to Rima Khachatryan. She was named Honoured Pedagogue of Armenia in 2017, was awarded the "Anania Shirakatsi" Medal in 2008, Commemorative Medal of the Prime Minister of Armenia in 2018 and Gold Medal of the Ministry of Education and Science of Armenia (2005).

During the Soviet period she was awarded the Medal "Veteran of Labour" in 1984. She also received the Medal of the General Confederation of Trade Unions (2017).

In 2020 the Executive Coaching & Training Institute was named after its founder, Rima Khachatryan.

=== Executive Coaching and Training Institute, ECTI ===
The Executive Coaching and Training Institute (ECTI) was established in 2018 by a group of professionals led by Rima Khachatryan. Its activities include lifelong learning initiatives focused on capacity building, developing the professional skills of the existing workforce, and providing vocational education.

ECTI has collaborated with the UCL Bartlett School of Environment, Energy and Resources on the development of training materials and educational courses. The collaboration has addressed topics including renewable energy systems, the environmental impacts of energy production and use, and related educational programs.

A merit-based scholarship was established in 2020 in memory of Rima Khachatryan for scholars and research fellows of the Executive Coaching and Training Institute (ECTI). It was set up to enhance lifelong learning and self-development. The fellowships are awarded by the ECTI Board of Trustees. A total of ten scholarships are awarded annually.

=== Commemoration ===
The most natural photo-portrait of Rima Khachatryan was made by Soviet Armenian photographer Armenak Hovhannisyan in his private studio in 1982, which later appeared on the cover of her book “Untold Story” published by the NewMag.

In 2012 the portrait of Rima Khachatryan in a traditional guise of the Armenian mother with an icon of the Virgin and the Child in her hands was painted by Zurab Modebadze (Tempera).

In 2020 the sculpture "On a Step Above Heaven" by David Minasyan (Դավիթ Մինասյան) was placed on the Nork Hills in Yerevan, Armenia(Marble), and Ricardo Sanz (pintor) produced her portrait from photographs of different years (Canvas).

== Bibliography ==
- Rima Khachatryan: Untold Story. Yerevan, NewMag. 2020. ISBN 978-9939-884-04-2.
- Rima Khachatryan, Munich: The Terminus. Yerevan, NewMag. 2021. ISBN 978-9939-884-12-7.
- Dunn, Cassadra (2021). Rima Khachatryan : the daughter of an émigré. London. ISBN 978-1-7399652-0-4. OCLC 1351843611.
- Dunn, Cassadra (2022). Rima Khachatryan : the daughter of an émigré (Second ed.). London. ISBN 978-1-7399652-1-1. OCLC 1341267924.
- Rima Khachatryan: The Pathway. Yerevan. NewMag, 2023. ISBN 978-9939-884-95-0.

== Textbooks ==
- Khachatryan, Rima (2007). Inorganic Chemistry: Textbook for medical colleges, Volume I, Yerevan. Lucky Print. ISBN 978-99941-71-19-4.
- Khachatryan, Rima (2007). Inorganic Chemistry: Textbook for medical colleges, Volume II. Lucky Print. ISBN 978-99941-71-19-4.
- Khachatryan, Rima (2009). Analytical Chemistry: Textbook for medical colleges. Legal Plus. ISBN 978-9939-815-19-0.
