= Ada Gabrielyan =

Armenian art teacher and painter (born 1941)

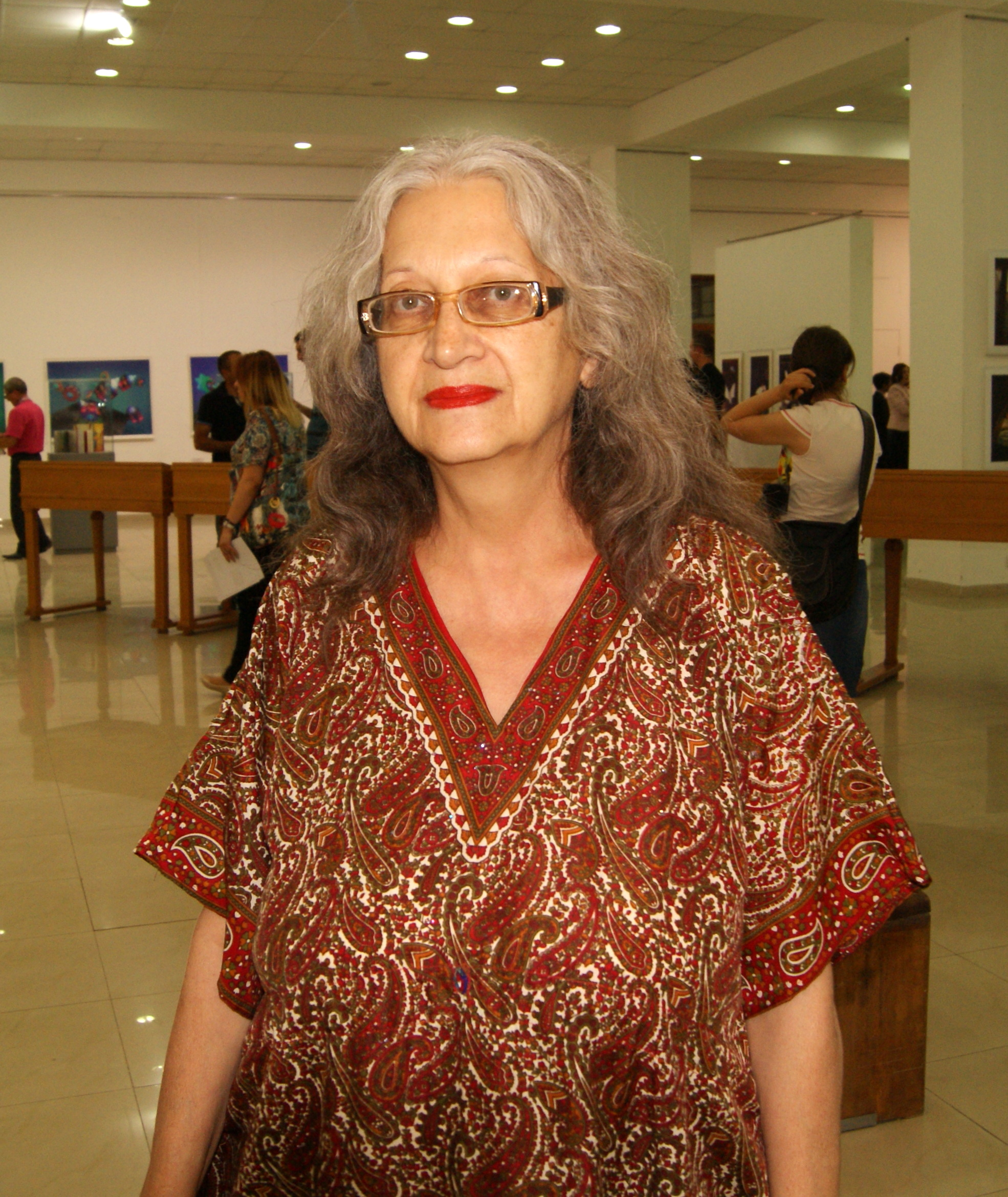
- Born: November 4, 1941 (age 84); Gyumri
- Occupation: teacher

Ada Gabrielyan (born November 4, 1941) is an Armenian art teacher and painter.

== Life ==
Gabrielyan was born in Gyumri. Born in 1941 in the Leninakan family of musicians. She graduated in 1965 from the Yerevan State Institute of Fine Arts and Theater. Her portrait by Armine Galentz was exhibited.

From 1977 to 1987, Gabrielyan taught at the Armenian State Pedagogical University. She has taught painting, drawing and composition at the Pedagogical Institute after Abovyan. From 1991 to 2001, she taught "Armenian Ritual Clothes" in the State Academy of Fine Arts of Armenia. She also taught at the Open University, University of Fine Arts.

Since 1990, she has written about the theory of archaic art and its relation to contemporary art such as painting, graphics, embroidery.
