= Davit Gharibyan =

Armenian actor-model

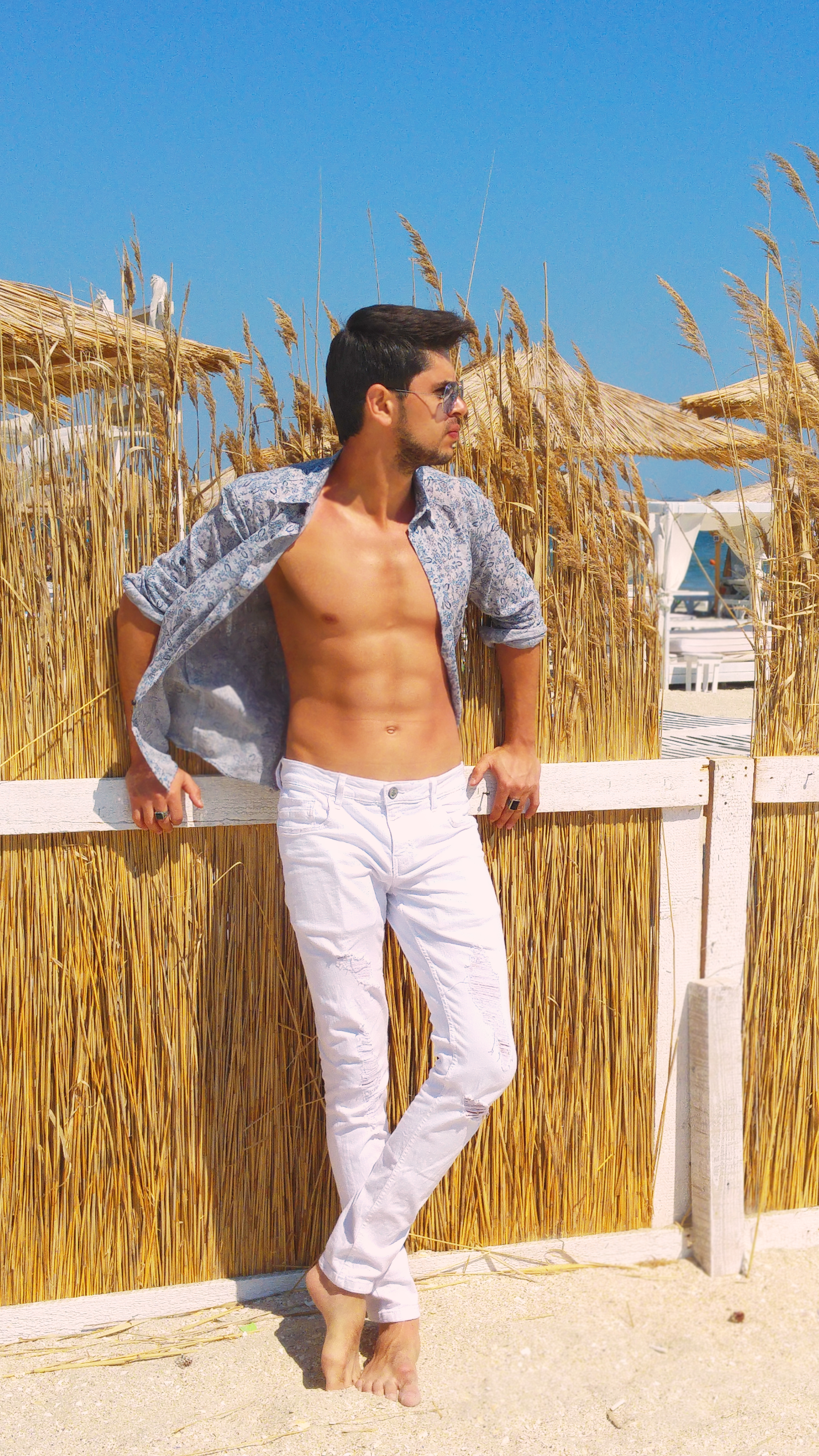
- Born: Դավիթ Ղարիբյան; May 29, 1990 (age 35); Yerevan, Armenian SSR, Soviet Union
- Occupations: model, actor, director, host
- Years active: 2007–present

Davit Gharibyan (Armenian: Դավիթ Ղարիբյան; born May 29, 1990, in Yerevan, Armenia) is an Armenian model, actor, director, host and publisher in music networks.

== Biography ==
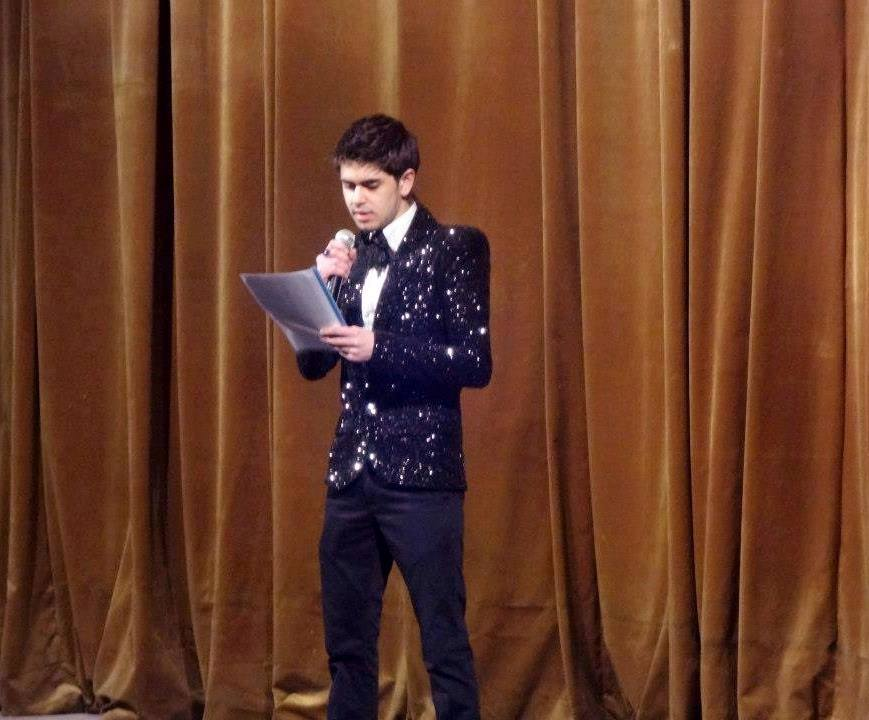
Davit Gharibyan

Davit Gharibyan was born on May 29, 1990, in Yerevan, Armenia. On 2007 he has graduated Khachatur Abovyan's number second school. Next to it he studied at State Engineering University of Armenia, as an engineer. On 2010 he also has graduated from Advances Academy of Yerevan of economical management, as a finances and credit specialist, as well as has graduated Yerevan State Song theatre, as a presenter and announcer of Shows. In 2011 he is doing his Master at Pedagogical University, as a director. Topic of the thesis was: "National Costumes in Mass Theatrical Celebrations."

On the 2013 is taken on as an applicant at the Art Institute of NAS RA on specialty "Fine art, decorative and applied arts, design."

== Career ==
He was invited as a juri of beauty contests, took part in several films and music video clips and also announced several charitable concerts.

In December 2009 took part in the contest-festival "Best Model of the World XXII ", held in Sofia. In 2011 participated in contest-festival "International Best Male and Female Model World" and "Costa Blanca Fashion Week" representing Armenia and appear in Top 5.

On 2014 he became Mister Fashion Beauty Universal model competition's winner. There were 111 models from all over the world.

In 2016 he was invited to conduct professional training at the Top International Model of the World competition in Romania.

He is currently working at the Armenian Academic Opera and Ballet Theatre A. Spendiaryan as an actor.

== Television ==
TV companies	TV series	Year	Country
Armenia TV	"The Hard Life" "Դժվար ապրուստ"	2012	Yerevan; Armenia
Armenia 1 TV	"The General's Daughter" "Գեներալի աղջիկը"	2013	Yerevan; Armenia

== Modeling Competition-festival ==
Contents	Year	Country	Country represented	Title
Best Model of the World	2009	Bulgaria	Ukraine	Best Model of Ukraine
International Best Model World	2011	Spain	Armenia	TOP 5 finalists
Mister Fashion Beauty Universal	2014	Portugal	Armenia	Winner

== Theatre ==
Opera	Part	Year	Country
Arshak II	Ambassador	2013	Yerevan, Armenia
Aida	Guardsman	2014	Yerevan, Armenia
Aleko	Gypsy	2014	Yerevan, Armenia
Anoush	Villager	2014	Yerevan, Armenia
Romeo and Juliet	Guard	2014	Yerevan, Armenia
La traviata	Waiter	2014	Yerevan, Armenia
Spartacus	Spartans	2014	Yerevan, Armenia
Il trovatore	Guardsman	2014	Yerevan, Armenia
Almast	Warrior	2014	Yerevan, Armenia
Norma	Guardsman	2014	Yerevan, Armenia
Carmen	Toreador	2014	Yerevan, Armenia
Giselle	Cavaler	2014	Yerevan, Armenia
