= Yerevan State Pantomime Theatre =

Armenian professional theatre

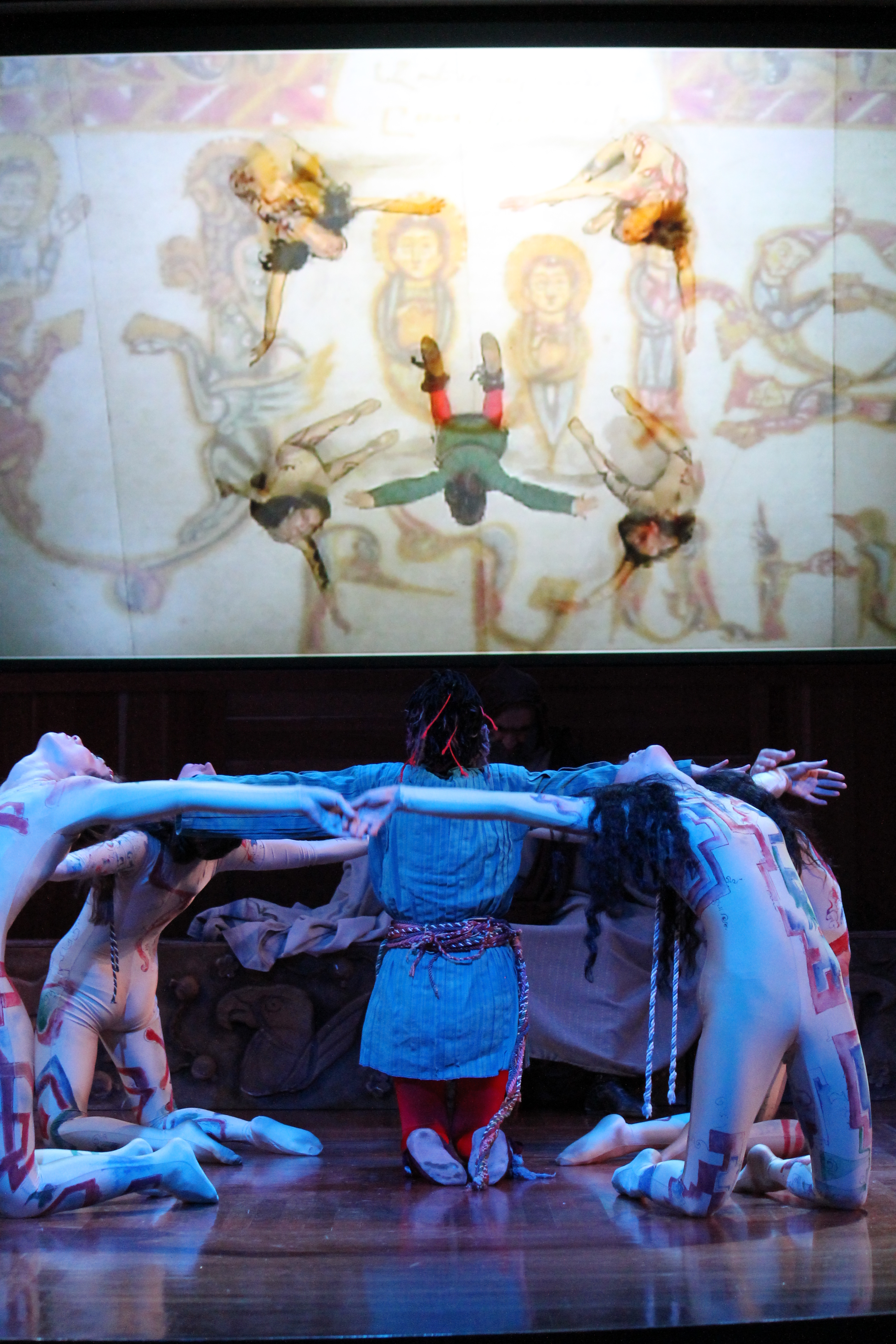
The scene from the performance "Book of Flowers", the Los Angeles Central Library, 2012.

Yerevan State Pantomime Theatre was founded in 1974. The status of the State Theatre received in 1983.

On May 4, 2017, by the Decision of the Government of Armenia a territory was given to the Theatre, which is located at Gevorg Kochar Street 21.

Today there are 18 performances in the theatre repertoire.

Since 1998, the art director of Yerevan State Pantomime Theatre is RA Honorary Worker of Art Zhirayr Dadasyan.

Since 2015, the director of Yerevan State Pantomime Theatre is Aram Khojoyan.

Many great artists appreciated the activities of the theatre. Once Arkadi Raikin said: "I have seen numerous pantomime theatres and groups, however, easily I shall recognize Yerevan Pantomime among hundreds of theatres."

== History of the theatre ==
Yerevan State Pantomime Theatre, as a professional theatre group, was established in 1969. A student of Moscow State Institute of Theatre Arts Henrik Poghosyan, being attracted by the genre of pantomime, established "Tushpa" theatre group and with his program of miniatures became a laureate of Republic Student Spring Festival of 1969.

The theatre operated in the House of Art Employers of Armenia; P. Sevak's "Unceasing Belfry", H. Poghosyan's "Move It, Time!" and other performances were staged.

In 1972 H. Poghosyan invited Arsen Polandov - a student from Directory faculty of Moscow University of Culture, to stage a performance. A. Polandov had already graduated from two-year classes of pantomime in State Institute of Cinema, which was led by the famous Russian mime A. Rumnyev, who was one of the best specialists of pantomime. Later, H. Poghosyan left the theatre, the group was broken up, and Polandov that had already come to Yerevan had to start everything from the beginning. The theatre group, which rapidly and completely renewed its staff including Nune Oganezova, Samvel Aghabalyan, Levon Ivanyan, Levon Hovsepyan, Karine Shahinyan, Ruzan Banduryany, Stepan Shahinyan and others, staged William Saroyan's novel “The Hungeries” and a series of miniatures.

On May 18, 1974, the mime theatre group played the first full performance for the Armenian Fine Arts Council of Ministry of Culture and for other famous cultural figures and became a professional collective and was included in "ArmConcert".

And 1974 is considered the year of Pantomime Theatre establishment. From the first program the style of the theatre was obvious. Later, several performances and miniatures were staged, such as "Heroic Ballad", "Stone, Eagle and Man", "Blinds", "The Robber and the Child", "Autumn", "Virus of Laugh" miniatures and Saroyan's "Who is there?", Gogol's "Overcoat" performances.

The Theatre had a number of tours in Armenia, in large and small cities of the Soviet Union - from Ukraine (Odesa), Belarus, Moldova to Ural, Siberia, Sakhalin, Kamchatka, Kuril Islands, Moscow, Sankt Petersburg, etc. The theatre was welcomed with great interest and warmth. Participating in numerous republic, Soviet Union and international festivals, the theatre always became a laureate.

Public interest towards the pantomime art gradually grew. In “Lusashkh” House a pantomime studio was established which was led by Levon Ivanyan – one of the actors of the theater. The students of the studio often were included in the performances. Later, Pantomime Theatre of Journalist's House was established on the basis of this studio; it was led by Anna Safaryan.

== State status ==
Nevertheless, the greatest event in the biography of the theatre happened in 1983, when the theatre got state status. The State, particularly the Ministry of Culture, took under its protection the further activities of Pantomime Theatre providing the development of pantomime as a genre. However, the most important problem remained unsolved; a necessary space for the unobstructed and uninterrupted activities of the Theatre was solved partly. For a theatre, that has a repertory and does not have its own territory, it is extremely difficult to plan further activities.

Even not having necessary working conditions, the theatre went on with its triumph: performances, tours, festivals. As a result of researches of roots of Armenian pantomime some experiences were realized to find new expressive ways of presentation. And one remarkable example is the actor Levon Ivanyan's mimodrama based on P.Sevak's poem “And a Man Named Mashtots”.

== The theater after the declaration of independence ==
Biography of the theatre in a period of the Armenian independence was a very difficult one - full of contradictions and changes. The confused social situation in the Republic reflected on the theatre as well. Unexpectedly Aresn Polandov's health state grew worse.

In 1993 by Aresen Polandov's suggestion the art director of the theatre was appointed Yuri Kostanyan, who had begun his creative work in the field of pantomime still in the beginning of 70s; he was a student of legendary Modris Tenisons in Kaunas.

A process, which can be characterized as an exchange of generations, began and as any change it was accompanied with many difficulties. New young actors and stage managers were invited. Creative, innovative and modern means of expression were chased. It became possible temporally to have a territory – the stage of the later Student Theatre of the Academy of Fine Arts. With the great efforts of Yuri Kostanyan and the whole theatre staff it was reconstructed and became a little cozy theatre. However, different ideas of various stage makers only harmed the process of creating a new and inseparable character of the theatre. The only performance with the new staff and a new style was Yuri Kostanyan's "Awaken Dream".

In May, 1998 by the offer of Yuri Kostanyan Zhirayr Dadasyan was appointed the art director of the theatre. This period is distinguished by the affirmation of new means of expressions and forming of the repertory. The theatre began performing on tours abroad: Germany, Georgia, Egypt, Iran, Libya, etc.

In order to make professional mimes and always have good actors in the theatre, in 1999 an adjacent mime studio was formed, led by an actor of the theatre Hamlet Chobanyan. Today the graduated students are included in the main staff of the theatre and participate in the repertory performances of the theatre.

In 1996 a pantomime course was established in Yerevan State Institute of Theatre and Cinematography; it was led by Stepan Shahinyan. In 2003 the directory of the Institute closed the course, but in 2004 it was reopened. The course is led by Zhirayr Dadasyan and Yuri Kostanyan.

== International Festivals ==
=== Nazenik International Festival ===
The Armenian pantomime has a history of centuries. In written sources and in manuscripts we come across numerous images and notes about pantomime artists. One of the most famous Armenian historians Movses Khorenatsi wrote about Nazenik, a slave who infatuated Armenian king with her pantomime dance in a royal feast - "As if Nazenik was singing with her hands". Her character later has become a source of inspiration for many creators.

The International Pantomime Festival organized by the theatre in Yerevan in 2001 was also called “Nazenik”. This was the first international theatre festival in the period of Armenian independence. Famous Pantomime Theatres arrive in Yerevan from Moscow, Riga, Ljubljana, Ulan-Bator, Tbilisi, Irkutsk. Remarkable specialists of pantomime were invited to Armenia: Ilya Rutberg, Modris Tenisons, Hans Diter Ilgenen, Konstantin Kiriyak and others.

=== L. Yengibaryan International Mime Festival ===
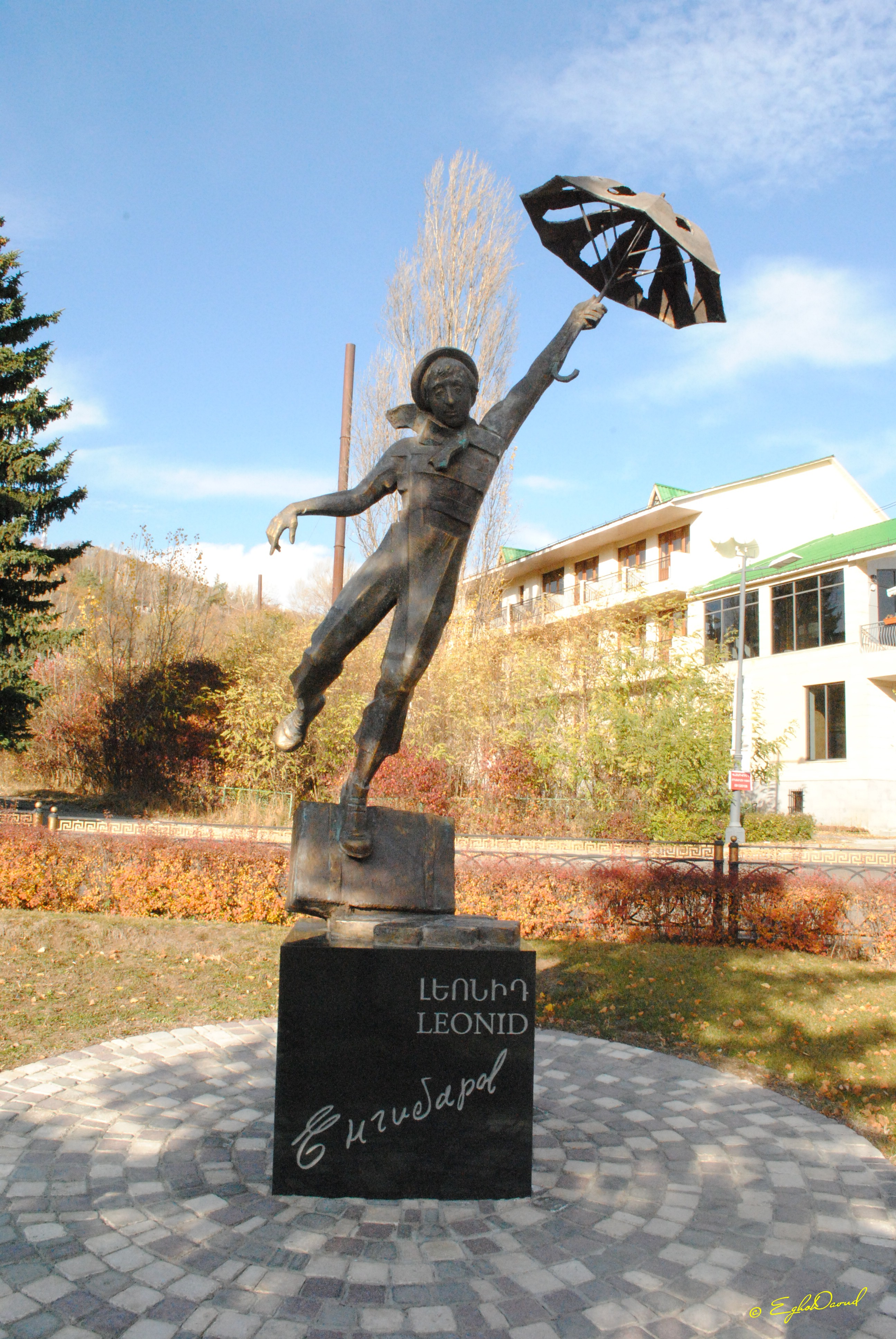
The statue of Leonid Yengibaryan in Tsaghkadzor

International Mime Festival is held biennially from 10 to 15 August in Tsaghkadzor, a tiny lovely city, an hour's way from Yerevan - the capital of Armenia.

The Festival is organized by the RA Ministry of Education, Science, Culture and Sport, Yerevan State Pantomime Theatre and Municipality of Tsakhkadzor.

The premier International Mime Festival was held in 2008. In 2010 the Festival was named after great clown-mime Leonid Yengibaryan and in 2012 the bronze statue of famous artist L. Yengibaryan was opened in the central square of Tsakhkadzor. In 2014 was held 4th International Mime Festival and in the program were included illusionists, living statues and sand painting.

During the festivals of 2008, 2010, 2012, 2014, 2016, 2017, 2019 participated theatre groups and solo artists from Spain, Italy, Germany, Greece, Russia, Latvia, USA, France, Czech Republic, Poland, Denmark, Japan, Kazakhstan, Bangladesh, Ukraine, Iran, Thailand, South Africa, Argentina, as well as Armenian theatre and circus groups, bands, fire shows, youth groups. The performances are played on open air stage in the central square or just in the street and are free for the audience.

The initiators are always filled with the enthusiasm of organizing an art holiday for tourists, for Tshaghkadzor population and for the active youth - enjoying their summer time. During daytime the streets of Tsaghkadzor are full of acrobats, street performers, and at night already astonished kids and adults gather in front of the central stage to admire with diverse theatre troupes, professional solo mimes, fire shows, flash mobs, master classes, dance classes.

After the show, the artists, the audience and the organizers have active discussions followed by master classes, where the two crucial components of the Festival - the audience and the artists have real contact, and both are impressed: the foreign artists with the warm hospitality and the Armenian rich culture, and the audience for the wonderful experience and unforgettable memories...

During the Festival Tsaghkadzor turns into the atmosphere of mystery, comic tragedy, humor, love, cuddle and smile - completing one another. This is a unique world where the people are constantly charged with positive emotions.

== Repertory of Theatre ==
- “Pierrot's Dream” (2019) /Director: Zhirayr Dadasyan/
- “Theatre in Palm” (2018) /Director: Yuri Kostanyan/
- “Insomnia” (2017) /Director: Mary Kirakosyan/
- “Galatea” (2016) /Director: Yuri Kostanyan/
- Spirit of Throne” (2015) /Director: Yuri Kostanyan/
- “Goat-Rite” (2014) /Director: Zhirayr Dadasyan/
- “Soul of Chair” (2012) /Director: Yuri Kostanyan/
- “Sonnet N 90” (2010) /Director: Yuri Kostanyan/
- “Ardalion” (2009) /Director: Zhirayr Dadasyan/
- “Flowers' Manuscript ” (2008) /Director: Zhirayr Dadasyan/
- “Demon” (2007) /Director: Yuri Kostanyan/
- “Sheranik” (2005) /Director: Zhirayr Dadasyan/
- “Metamorphose” (1999) /Director: Yuri Kostanyan/
- “Flowers of Evil” (1998) /Director: Zhirayr Dadasyan/
- “How to Paint a Bird” (1998) /Director: Zhirayr Dadasyan/
- “Butterflies” (1997) /Director: Zhirayr Dadasyan/
- “The Game” (1996) /Director: Zhirayr Dadasyan/
- “Eagles” (1994) /Director: Zhirayr Dadasyan/

== Tours of Pantomime Theater ==
- 2020 - Iran - Tehran / Italy - Milan
- 2018 - Russia - Saint Petersburg/ Moldova - Chisinau/ Russia - Vologda/ Macedonia - Veles/ Russia - Moscow
- 2017 - Russia - Chelyabinsk/ Moldova - Chisinau/ Ukraine - Kharkiv, Zaporizhzhia/ Russia - Tyumen/ Russia - Yekaterinburg, Chelyabinsk, Zlatoust
- 2016 - Bosnia & Herzegovina - Republika Srpska - Banja Luka/ Malta –Vittoriosa
- 2015 - Bosnia & Herzegovina - Republika Srpska - Banja Luka/ Georgia - Tbilisi/ Serbia - Belgrade/ Georgia - Tbilisi/ Germany – Bremen
- 2014 - Turkey - Istanbul/ Iran - Tehran, Kish Island/ Turkmenistan - Ashgabat/ Poland - Wroclaw
- 2013 – Thailand - Bangkok/ Poland - Poznan/ Germany - Bonn, Cologne/ Russia - Murmansk/ Georgia -Tbilisi
- 2012 - USA - Los Angeles
- 2011 - Switzerland - Zurich
- 2007 – Italy - Rome/ China - Beijing, Shenyang
- 2006 - Russia - Yekaterinburg, Moscow/ Romania - Sibiu
- 2004 - UAE - Sharjah
- 2003 - Lebanon - Beirut
- 2002 - Iran - Tehran
- 2001 - Egypt – Cairo
- 1998 - Germany/ Georgia -Tbilisi
- 1991 – Serbia - Belgrade
- 1983 - Russia - Central Siberia/ Germany
- 1982 - Russia - Leningrad/ Hungary
- 1981 - Russia - Siberia, Omsk, Tomsk, Kemerovo, Barnaul, Angarsk, Bratsk, Blagoveshchensk
- 1980 – Russia/ Ukraine - Kyiv, Odesa
- 1978 - Russia/ Belarus/ Moldova
- 1976 - Ural - Sverdlovsk, Chelyabinsk, Magnitogorsk/ Russia/ Middle East
- 1975 - Ukraine - Voroshilovgrad, Kharkiv, Lysychansk, Kadiivka
