= Varduhi Varderesyan =

Armenian actress

- Վարդուհի Վարդերեսյան
- Born: 19 March 1928; Bucharest, Romania
- Died: 24 November 2015 (aged 87); Yerevan, Armenia
- Occupation: actress
- Years active: 1946-2002
- Children: two sons

Varduhi Varderesyan (Armenian: Վարդուհի Վարդերեսյան; 19 March 1928 – 24 November 2015) was an Armenian actress. She repatriated to Armenia in 1946, where she finished the studio of Leninakan Drama Theatere (now Gyumri, Armenia), then worked in the same theater. Since 1958, she had been one of the leading actresses of the Sundukyan Drama Theatre of Yerevan. In 1988, she won the People's Artist of the USSR. In 2002 she was declared an honorary citizen of Yerevan.

== Filmography ==
- 1955 - Looking of the Addressee (Hastseatiroj voronumnere) as Arevik
- 1956 - A Matter of Honour (Patvi hamar) as Margarit Elizbarova
- 1958 - Mother's Heart (Mor sirte) as Mariam
- 1959 - A Jump Over the Precipice (as Gayane)
- 1961 - Northern Rainbow (Hyusisayin tziatzan) as Nune
- 1962 - Steps (Qayler) (1962) (TV)
- 1963 - Road to the Stage (Tchanaparh depi krkes) as Maro
- 1965 - A Sham Informer (as Zaruhi), short
- 1966 - Mr. Jacques and Others (Msyo Zhake yev urishner) as Zaruhi
- 1969 - Karine as Lawyer's wife
- 1970 - Morgan's Relative (Morgani khnamin)(TV) as Magtagh
- 1972 - Hayrik (as Nvard)
- 1973 - Adventures of Mher on Vacation (starring)
- 1973 - Father (Hayrik) as Nvard
- 1979 - Blue Lion (as a servant)
- 2002 - The Journey, as Eve's grandmother
