= Hagop Baronian =

Ottoman Armenian writer, playwright, journalist and educator

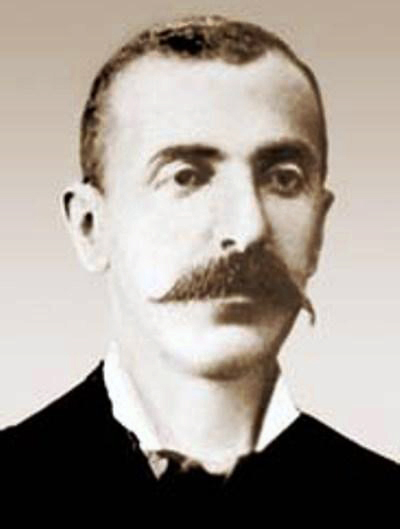
- Born: 19 November 1843; Adrianople, Ottoman Empire
- Died: 27 May 1891 (aged 47); Constantinople, Ottoman Empire
- Occupations: Author, newspaper editor, educator
- Writing career
- Period: 19th century
- Genre: Satire
- Subjects: Society, politics
- Notable work: Honorable Beggars
- Movement: Realism

Hagop Baronian (Armenian: Յակոբ Պարոնեան; (Note: Hakob Paronyan (Reformed orthography: Հակոբ Պարոնյան) according to Eastern Armenian pronunciation.) 19 November 1843 – 27 May 1891) was an influential Ottoman Armenian writer, playwright, journalist, and educator in the 19th century. His is considered the first satirist in modern Armenian literature.

== Biography ==
Hagop Baronian was born into a poor Armenian family in Adrianople (Edirne) on 19 November 1843. He attended Armenian primary and secondary schools, and then attended a Greek school for a year. He was forced to discontinue his education to find work. He worked first in a chemist's shop, and then as a bookkeeper.

In 1864, Baronian moved to Constantinople, where he first worked at a telegraph office and began his literary and journalistic career. He read extensively and taught himself multiple European languages, particularly French and Italian, which had the most significant influence on the Constantinopolitan literature and theater of the time. Among the authors that he read were Pierre Corneille, Jean Racine, Molière, and Jean de La Bruyère.

Baronian started his career as a playwright, writing in 1865 the comedies Yergou derov dzara me ('A servant with two masters', published 1911) and Adamnapuyzhn arevelyan ('Oriental dentist', published 1868). His satirical writings began appearing in Armenian newspapers. He initially worked for Pogh aravodyan ('Morning trumpet'), and then for Yeprad ('Euphrates'), where he served as the editor from 1871. He also worked for Harutiun Svadjian's journal Meghu ('Bee', later renamed Tadron), and he was appointed as its editor in 1872.

In 1871–1872, Baronian taught at the Mezbourian Armenian school. In 1873, he was a clerk of the Armenian Patriarchate. After this, he taught for a year at the Armenian school in Scutari, where the notable Armenian poet Bedros Tourian was among his students. Baronian became very popular but also made many prominent enemies with his satire. Tadron eventually had to close because of financial difficulties and political targeting. Baronian continued to publish his writings in various Armenian newspapers; these included Russian Armenian ones, where he could avoid Ottoman censorship. In 1876, he published the illustrated journal Tadron paregam mangants.

Baronian moved to Smyrna (İzmir) in mid-1877 for financial reasons. In September 1878, he moved back to his hometown, but he returned to Constantinople permanently in June 1879. He married in 1879 and had to work as a bookkeeper to support himself. In 1880, his longest work, Honorable Beggars (Medzabadiv Mouratsganner), was serialized; it is regarded as his best work. Also in 1880, he became the secretary of the United Society of Armenians. The repressive conditions of the Hamidian period forced him to refrain from writing openly on political subjects and instead focus on social and communal issues.

In 1883, he published the weekly brochure Dzidzagh ('Mirth'), which contained allegorical satires and lasted for a year. In 1884, he founded the journal Khigar, which operated until it was suppressed by the government in 1888. He then became the accounting teacher at the Getronagan Armenian High School. He died of tuberculosis, in extreme poverty, on 27 May 1891.

== Works ==
The title page of the 1950 Yerevan edition of Honorable Beggars

Baronian's most significant works include the satirical novel Honorable Beggars (Medzabadiv Mouratsganner, 1887), the famous literary diary Hoshosi tseradedr ('Notebook of this and that', also Im tseradedre, 1880), and the comedies Baghdasar Aghbar ('Brother Balthazar', 1886) and Adamnapuyzhn arevelyan ('Oriental dentist', published 1868). In these works, Baronian satirized the defects of Constantinople's society.

Baronian was also known for his biting, sarcastic criticisms of leading figures in the Armenian social circles of Constantinople; some of these critical comments appear in his book Azkayin Chocher ('National bigshots').

== Tributes ==
The Paronyan Musical Comedy Theatre is named after Hagop Baronian, as are a school and a street in that city.
