= Karp Khachvankyan =

Armenian actor and director (1923–1998)

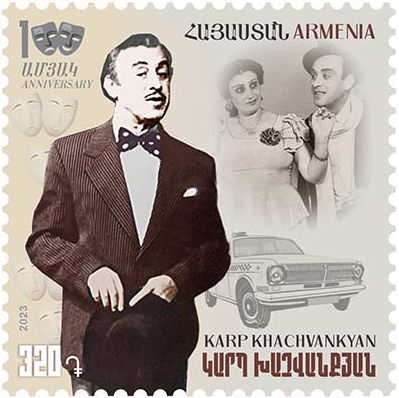
Khachvankyan on a 2023 stamp of Armenia

Karp "Karapet" Mkrtchi Khachvankyan (Armenian: Կարպ Խաչվանքյան; 23 January 1923 in Akhaltskha – 29 November 1998 in Yerevan) was an Armenian actor and director, People's Artist of Armenia (1967). He was known as the "King of Laughter".

== Biography ==
From 1941 to 1944. Khachvankyan studied at the Actor's school of the Tbilisi film studio. From 1944 until his death, Khachvankyan acted at the Paronyan Musical Comedy Theatre of Yerevan, performing more than 100 roles.

From 1984 to 1988, Khachvankyan was the artistic director of the Paronyan and directed 13 plays.

He was best known for his comic roles, such as Knyaz in Taxi, Taxi, Thodoros in the Dimitris Psathas play Liar Wanted, and Skapen in Skapen’s Pranks.

His directing included Man of La Mancha (where he played both Miguel de Cervantes and Don Quixote), Silva by Emmerich Kálmán, and Love under the Stars by A. Ayvazyan.

Khachvankyan also played in films, including The Girl from Ararat Valley (1950), Patvi hamar (1956), and Road to the Stage (1963).

== Selected filmography ==
=== Acting ===
- 1949 – The Girl of Ararat Valley, as Poghos
- 1956 – Patvi hamar, as Suren Elizbarov
- 1963 – Road to the Stage, as Ashot
- 1982 – Eastern Dentist, as Niko (TV Movie)
- Taxi, Taxi, as Knyaz
- Liar Wanted, as Thodoros
- Skapen’s Pranks as Skapen

=== Directing ===
- Man of La Mancha
- Silva
- Love under the Stars
