= Svetlana Grigoryan =

Svetlana Rubeni Grigoryan (Armenian: Սվետլանա Ռուբենի Գրիգորյան, September 30, 1930 – May 12, 2014) was an Armenian actress who was awarded the title People's Artist of Armenia.

== Biography ==
Grigoryan was born in Yerevan .She performed onstage from the age of 13. After graduating from the Yerevan Institute of Fine Arts and Theater, Vardan Ajemian invited her to the Paronyan Musical Comedy Theatre of Yerevan where she has been working to this day.

Grigoryan was well known for comedic roles (Roza in Taxi, Taxi; Satenik in Im zokanche) at the Paronyan State Theater of Musical Comedy.

In 2011, the President of Armenia awarded Grigoryan the "First Degree Medal “For Services to Homeland” for "her considerable contributions to development of theatrical arts, for her high acting skills and for creating permanent characters". She also received the Hakob Meghapart Medal for her services, and upon the occasion of her 80th birthday.

== Death ==
She died at the age of 83 on 12 May 2014.
