= Road to the Stage =

- Directed by: Henrik Malyan; Levon Isahakyan
- Written by: Aleksandr Yurovsky (writer)
- Starring: Leonid Yengibarov, Izabella Danzas, Hayk Danzas, Varduhi Varderesyan, Karp Khachvankyan
- Music by: Konstantin Orbelyan
- Production company: Armenfilm
- Release date: October 1963
- Running time: 88 minutes
- Country: Soviet Union
- Languages: Armenian; Russian

Road to the Stage (Armenian: Ճանապարհ դեպի կրկես, romanized: Chanaparh depi krkes, Russian: Путь на арену, romanized: Put na arenu) is a 1963 Russian-Armenian film from the Soviet Union about a young circus artist (Leonid Yengibarov) who becomes a famous star.

The circus troupe of Armenian SSR took part in the shoot.

== Plot ==
The protagonist, Lyonya, the youngest son of the respected Professor Yengibaryan, dreams of working in the circus. However, his parents strongly oppose his aspirations. Despite their disapproval, Lyonya secures a job as a uniformed assistant, though he approaches his responsibilities with little seriousness.

One day, Lyonya impulsively decides to step beyond his assigned duties by performing as a clown during a show. Ill-prepared for his debut, he ruins the performance. Overwhelmed with shame after his failure, Lyonya decides to leave the circus.

Meanwhile, a meeting takes place in the circus director’s office. The director expresses his dissatisfaction, stating that Lyonya lacks talent. However, the acrobat Irina is the only one who doubts the director’s harsh judgment.

The director resolves to confront Lyonya and visits his home, where he meets Lyonya's parents. At the same time, Lyonya reflects on his mistakes and makes a firm decision to dedicate himself to rigorous training in preparation for the next performance.
