= Leonid Yengibarov =

Soviet Armenian clown and actor (1935–1972)

Leonid Yengibaryan
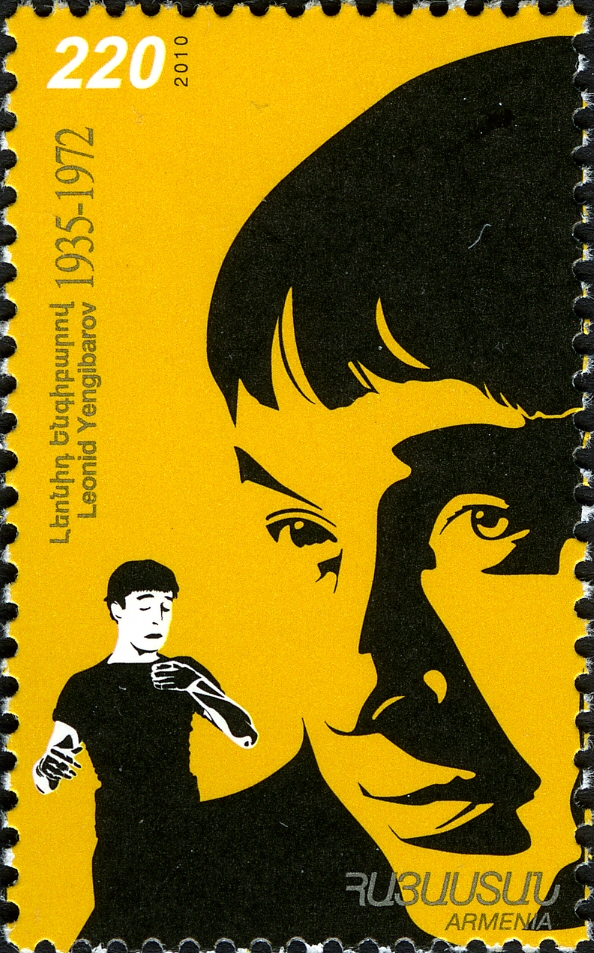
- Yengibarov on an Armenian stamp
- Born: March 15, 1935; Moscow, Soviet Union
- Died: July 25, 1972 (aged 37); Moscow, Soviet Union
- Resting place: Vagankovo Cemetery, Moscow; 55°46′05″N 37°32′54″E
- Occupations: Clown and actor
- Partner: Jarmila Galamkova
- Children: 1

Leonid Georgievich Yengibarov (Armenian: Լեոնիդ Ենգիբարյան; Russian: Леонид Георгиевич Енгибаров; March 15, 1935 – July 25, 1972) was a Soviet Armenian clown and actor, People's Artist of the Armenian SSR.

== Biography ==
Leonid Yengibarov was born in Moscow to an Armenian father and a Russian mother. He started his career as a boxer. In 1955 he joined the State School of Circus Art, Clownship department. He graduated from Circus school with skills in juggling, acrobatics, and hand balancing. After graduation in 1959 he moved to Yerevan and joined the Armenian state circus.

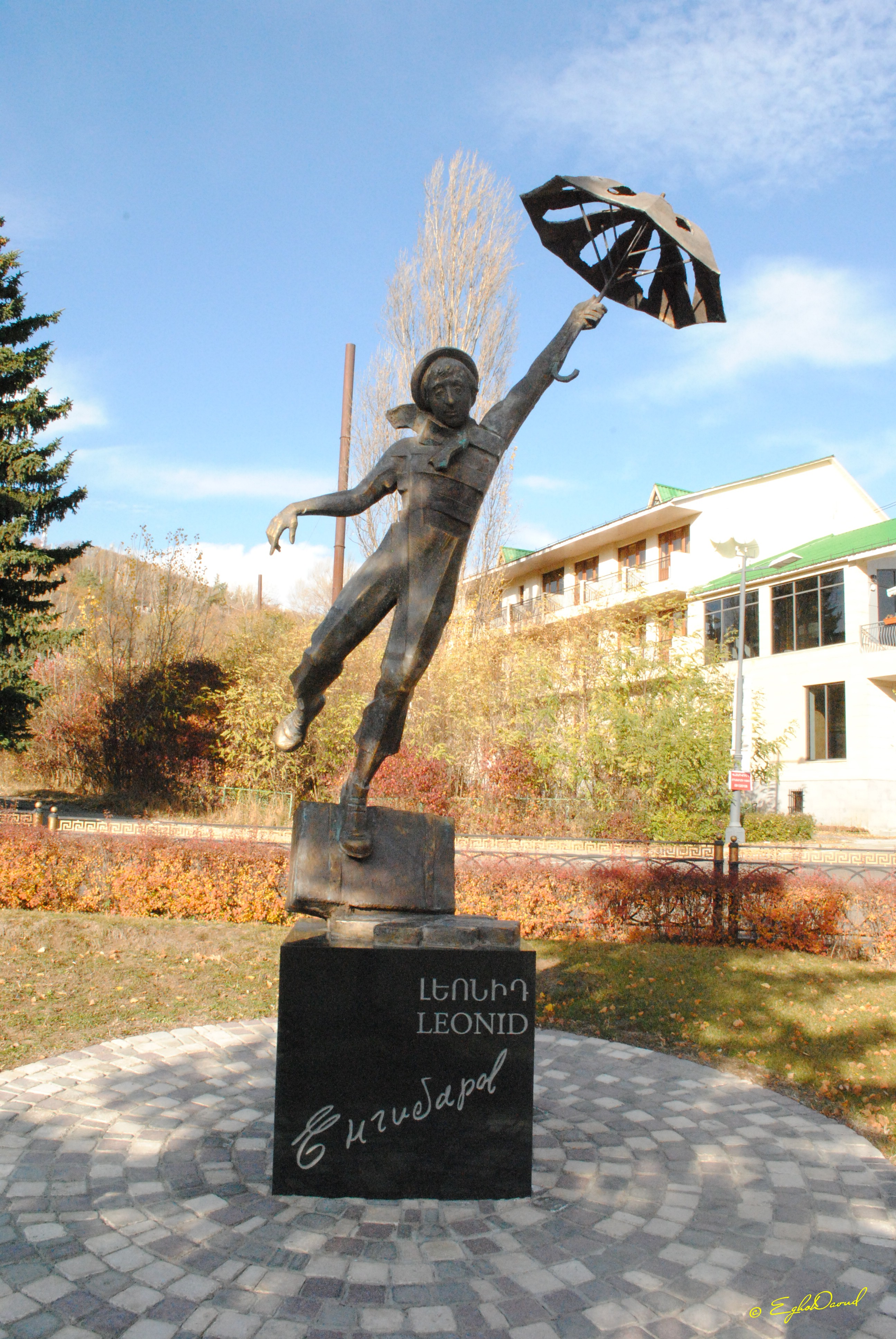
Statue of Leonid Yengibaryan in Tsaghkadzor

He was one of the first Soviet clowns to create the poetic, intellectual clownery, which made spectators think, not only laugh. Leonid Yengibarov, 'the clown with sad eyes', revolutionized the art of clownery by introducing lyrical tones into traditional buffoonery and grotesque sequences. According to the Spectacle journal,

he has shown the direction. He was the innovator. He began to do clown gags that were not funny, but very sad. They ended sadly. He felt that life was not funny anymore.

After initial incomprehension, his popularity grew immensely. After that he was invited to work in cinema. His first film, A Path to the Arena, was in fact about himself.

By the end of the 1960s he was known as one of the best clowns in the country and in the countries of the Eastern bloc, where he was permitted to travel. His circus career came to a halt in 1971: he left the State Circus when his partner was banned from international touring. He created a Variety Pantomime Theatre (Estradny teatr pantomimy) instead. However officially he was forbidden to call his company “theatre”, only allowed to use the term “troupe” (ансамбль). He managed to stage only a single piece, “Star Rain” before his untimely death from a massive heart attack. He is buried at the Vagankovo cemetery, Moscow.

His work continues influencing other artists including Slava Polunin.

His friend Vladimir Vysotsky wrote a shrill poem "To memory of the actor; To Yengibarov from the audience". Alla Pugacheva dedicated her song "Arlekino" to Yengibarov: "He was my favourite clown and even died while working. Just think: he died from laughter".

== Filmography ==
Yengibarov played in 15 films, including:

Year	Title	Role	Notes
1963	Road to the Stage (Путь на арену)	Leonid (himself)	
1965	Shadows of Forgotten Ancestors (Тени забытых предков)	Myko	directed by Sergei Parajanov
1966	Aybolit-66 (Айболит-66)	Cheerful clown # 1	
1971	A Necklace for My Beloved	Sugur	Comedy, directed by Tengiz Abuladze, cast in the Georgian SSR, Soviet Union
1972	Happy Go Lucky (Stoves-Benches, Печки-лавочки)	clown	

=== Films about him ===
THere are 20 films about Yengivarov, including:

- Please meet Leonid Yengibarov, Знакомьтесь: Леонид Енгибаров
- 2 Leonid 2, 2 Леонид 2

== Honors ==
- The E. Bass Cup (first prize) of the 1964 European Clown Competition in Prague;
- People's Artist of the Armenian SSR (1971)

== See also ==
- Yerevan Circus
