= Harutiun Svadjian =

Armenian writer

Harutiun Svadjian (1831 in Constantinople, Ottoman Empire – 1874 in Constantinople, Ottoman Empire), was an Armenian writer, political activist, teacher, and considered one of the founders of Armenian political humorist literature.
