= Armenian State Pedagogical University =

State university and higher education institution in Yerevan, Armenia

Khachatur Abovian Armenian State Pedagogical University
- Խաչատուր Աբովյանի անվան հայկական պետական մանկավարժական համալսարան
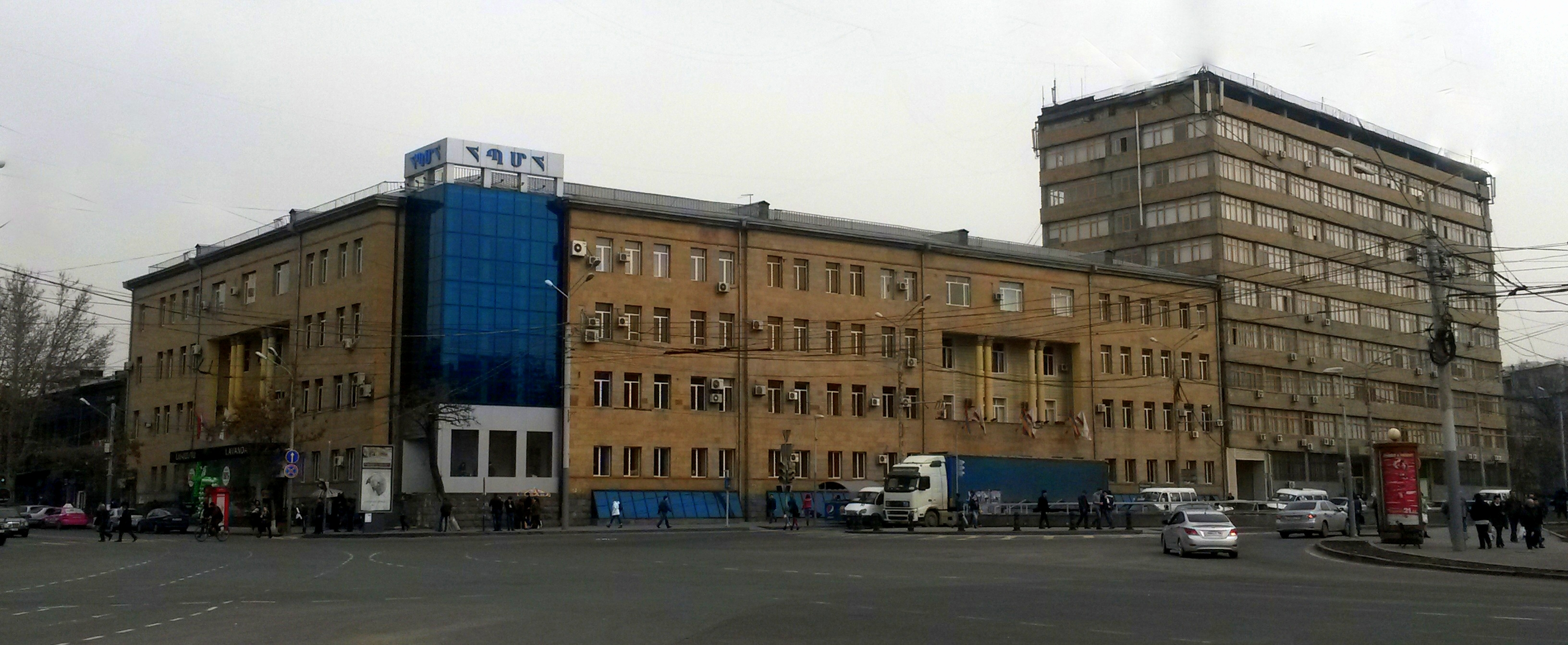
- The university building
- Type: Public
- Established: 1922; 104 years ago
- Founders: Arshavir Shavarshyan
- Rector: Srbuhi Gevorgyan
- Students: 10,000
- Location: Yerevan, Armenia; 40°10′30.64″N 44°31′25.18″E
- Campus: Urban
- Website: Official website

Khachatur Abovian Armenian State Pedagogical University (ASPU) (Armenian: Խաչատուր Աբովյանի անվան հայկական պետական մանկավարժական համալսարան, ՀՊՄՀ), is a state university and higher education institution based in Yerevan, the capital of Armenia. Founded in 1922, the university is specialized in pedagogy and the preparation of teaching staff.

Named after the 19th-century Armenian writer Khachatur Abovian, the current rector of the university is professor Srbuhi Gevorgyan.

== History ==
The Armenian State Pedagogical University was founded on November 7, 1922, and in 1948, it was named after Khachatur Abovian, an Armenian educator, poet and an advocate of modernization.

The newly established university had only a pedagogical faculty with preschool, school and extracurricular specialties. Classes started on November 27, in the building of the former Hripsimian gymnasium.

The university has 10 faculties and more than 50 chairs. Since the 2004–2005 academic year, the university has been implementing three-level (bachelor's, master's, postgraduate) education. The study period is 4 years for the bachelor's degree and 2 years for the master's degree. The university has a basic school as well as a high school-college in the center of Yerevan.

== ASPU Museum ==
The Museum of Armenian State Pedagogical University after Khachatur Abovyan was founded on May 11, 2004, and is under the administrative subordination of the University Council headed by the Rector. The current exhibition was opened on November 19, 2012, on the occasion of the 90th anniversary of the university. The Museum pays special attention to visitors with special educational needs.

== ASPU Trade Union ==
The ASPU Trade Organization or Trade Union is regulated by the Law on Public Organizations of the Republic of Armenia, the RA Labour Code, the ASPU Statute, the ASPU Trade Organization Charter and collective contracts. The union aims to solve the legal and social issues of the employees.

== Faculties ==
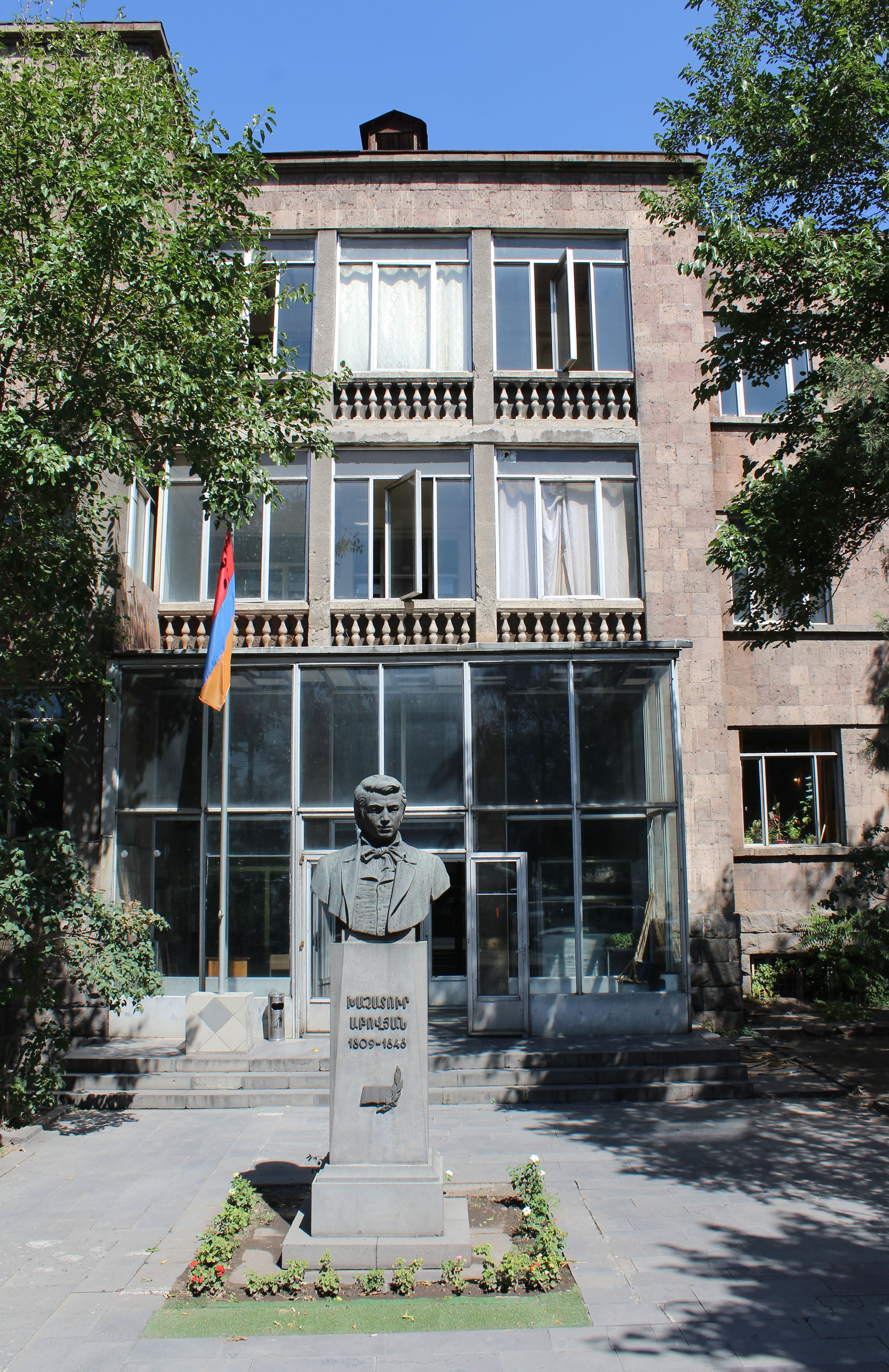
The statue of Khachatur Abovian at the university

As of 2017, the university is home to 10 faculties:

- Faculty of Philology
- Faculty of History and Social Science
- Faculty of Preschool Education
- Faculty of Biology, Chemistry and Geography
- Faculty of Education Psychology and Sociology
- Faculty of Foreign Languages
- Faculty of Mathematics, Physics and Informatics
- Faculty of Art Education
- Faculty of Special and Inclusive Education
- Faculty of Culture

== University Chairs ==
- Chair of Pedagogy
- Chair of Sports and Chess
- Chair of First Aid, Emergency and Civil Protection
- Chair of Economics and Management
- Chair of Philosophy and Logic named after Academician Georg Brutian
- Chair of Ecology and Sustainable Development

== Specializations ==
- Preschool Pedagogy and Methodology
- Social Pedagogy
- Elementary Pedagogy and Methodology
- Surdopedagogy
- Typhlo-Pedagogy
- Oligophrenic pedagogy
- Logopaedics [Speech Therapy]
- Armenian Language and Literature
- Physics
- Technologies and Entrepreneurships
- Informatics
- Mathematics
- Chemistry
- Biology
- Geography
- History
- Fine Arts
- Musical Education
- Choreography
- English Language and Literature
- German Language and Literature
- Russian Language and Literature
- Spanish Language and Literature
- Social Studies
- Artistic Photography
- Camera Operation
- Clothing Design
- Decorative and Applied Arts
- Instrumental Performance
- Directing
- Theory, History and Management of Arts
- Psychology
- Sociology
- Culturology
- Museology and Protection of Historical Monuments
- Journalism
- Library and Information Resources
- Environmental Studies
- Management (by industry)
- Social Work

== International Co-operation Unit ==
The International Co-operation Unit co-ordinates the implementation of strategic objectives of the university; co-operates with foreign higher education institutions and university structural divisions; develops co-operation projects; and monitors their implementation.

The university co-operates with the British Council, TEMPUS national agency, Rossotrudnichestvo (Russia), as well as with projects financed by the European Committee and other donor organizations.

== Notable alumni ==
- Jemma Ananyan, politician
- Zhirayr Ananyan, playwright
- Hovhannes Galstyan, film director, writer and producer
- Sargis Galstyan, actor and dancer
- Ara Gevorgyan, musician, composer and producer
- Davit Gharibyan, model, actor, producer and showman
- Movses Gorgisyan, National hero of the Republic of Armenia
- Stella Grigoryan, artist
- Hasmik Harutyunyan, folk singer
- Aramais Sahakyan, poet and translator
- Arthur Sarkissian, artist and painter
- Seyran Shahsuvaryan, Press-Secretary of the Ministry of Defence of the Republic of Armenia
- Arpine Mikaeli Ter-Petrosyan, (artistic name Arpi Alto), singer, songwriter, musician and record producer
- Taguhi Tovmasyan, politician
- Rima Khachatryan, Honored Pedagogue of The Republic of Armenia.

== Notable staff ==
- Ada Gabrielyan - archaic art
