= Paronyan Musical Comedy Theatre =

Theatre of the Armenian capital Yerevan

Coordinates: 40°10′38″N 44°30′39″E

Hakob Paronyan State Musical Comedy Theatre
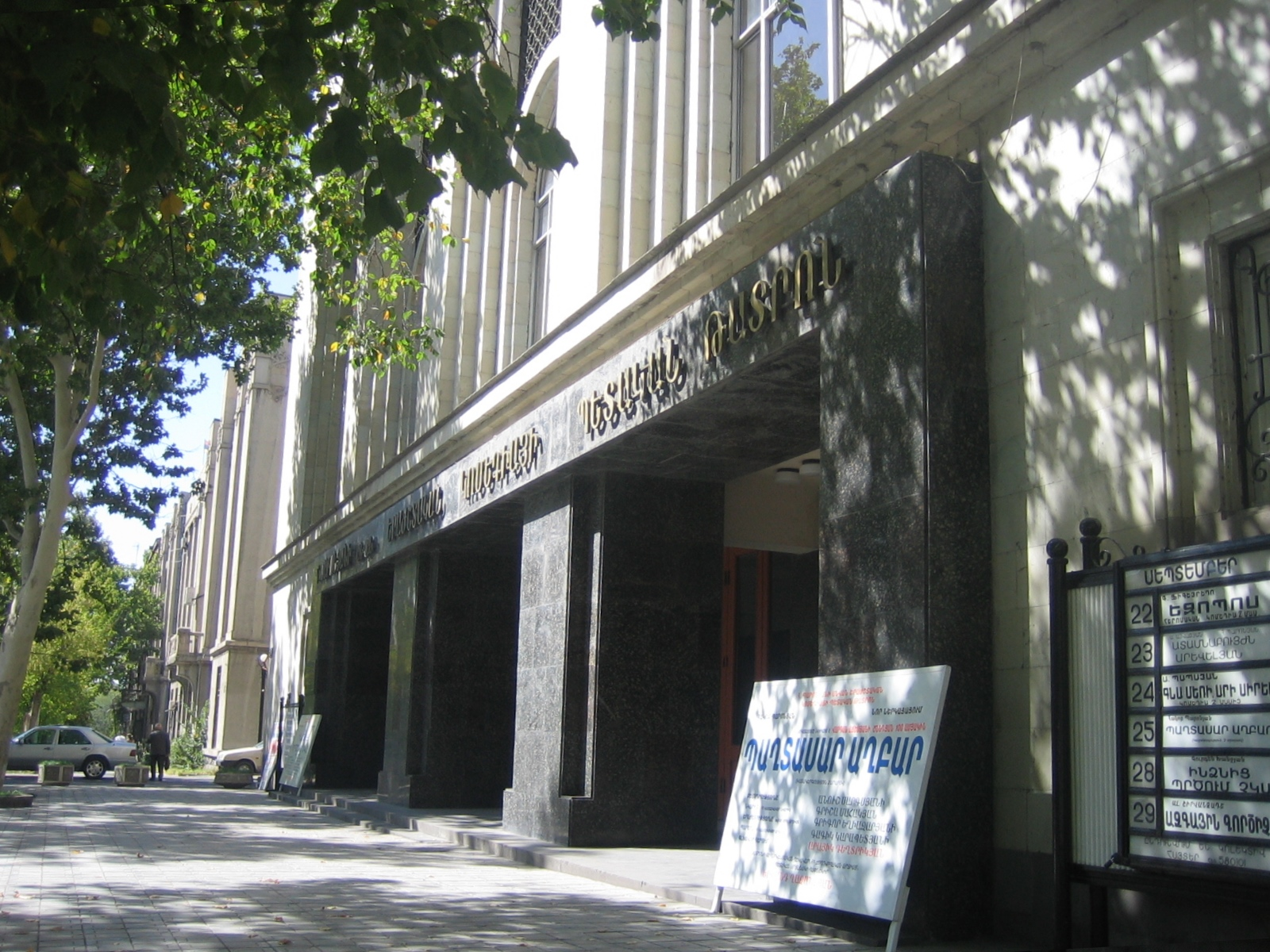
- Paronyan Musical Comedy Theatre
- Interactive map of Hakob Paronyan State Musical Comedy Theatre
- Address: Vazgen Sargsyan Streert; Yerevan; Armenia
- Owner: Government of Armenia
- Type: musical comedy

Construction
- Opened: 1941

Website
- comedytheater.am

The Hakob Paronyan State Musical Comedy Theatre (Armenian: Հակոբ Պարոնյանի անվան երաժշտական կոմեդիայի պետական թատրոն), founded in 1941, is one of the prominent theatres of the Armenian capital Yerevan. It is located on Vazgen Sargsyan Street in the central Kentron district of the city, near the Republic Square. It is named after the renowned Armenian satirist Hagop Baronian.

== History ==
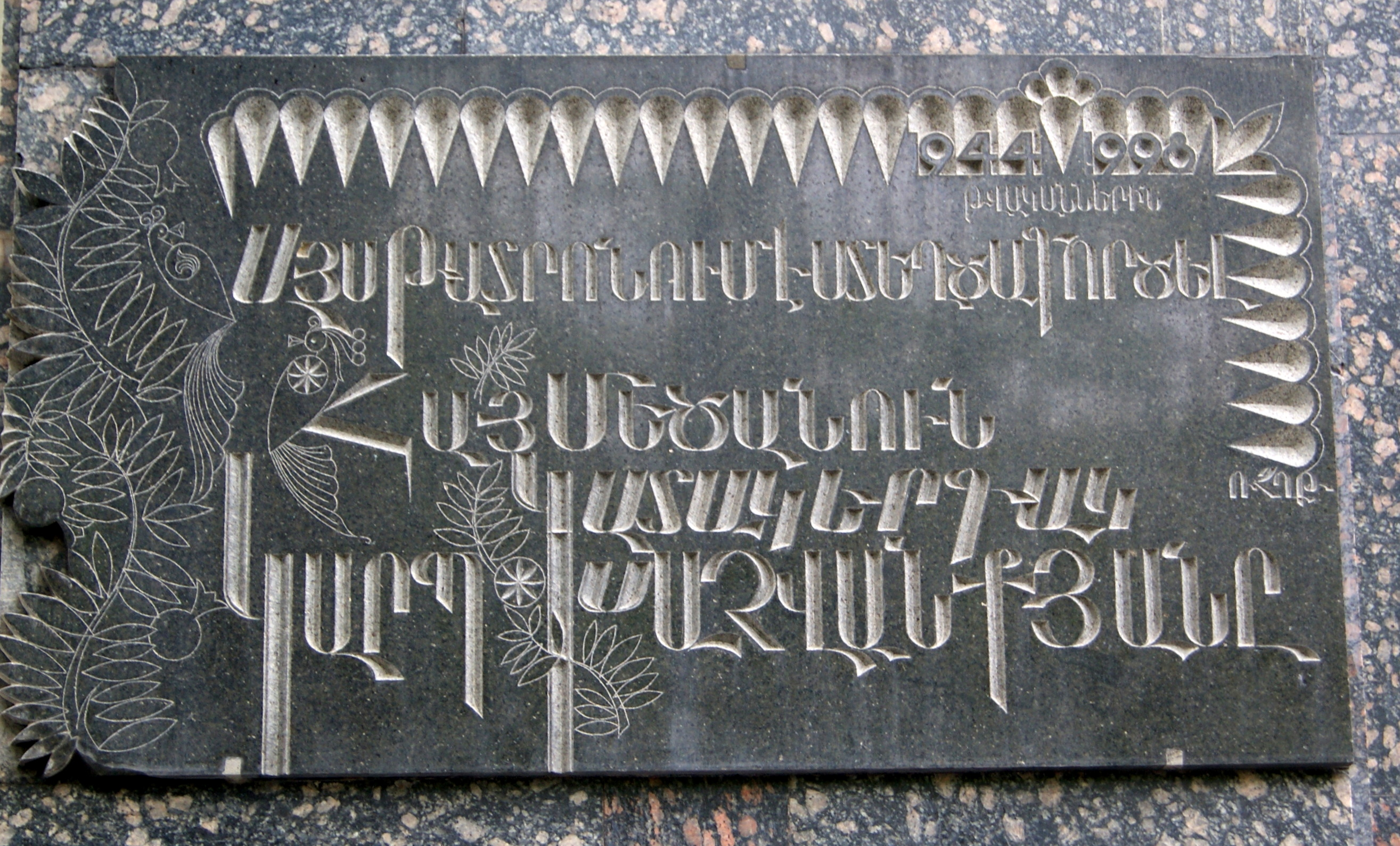
Plaque devoted to actor and director Karp Khachvankyan on the entrance wall of theater building

The Theatre was opened on June 22, 1942. The first artistic director was Shara Talyan. Many well-known persons worked in theatre, including Artemi Ayvazyan, Vardan Ajemian, Mikael Arutchian, Karp Khachvankyan, Svetlana Grigoryan, Armen Elbakyan, Yervand Ghazanchyan and others.

The Paronyan Theatre has participated in international theatre festivals in Armenia, Georgia, Iran, England, and the United States.

In February 2009, the Best Presentation Award of the Artavazd-2009 festival was given to Yervand Ghazanchyan, who has been the artistic director of the theatre since 1993.

== See also ==
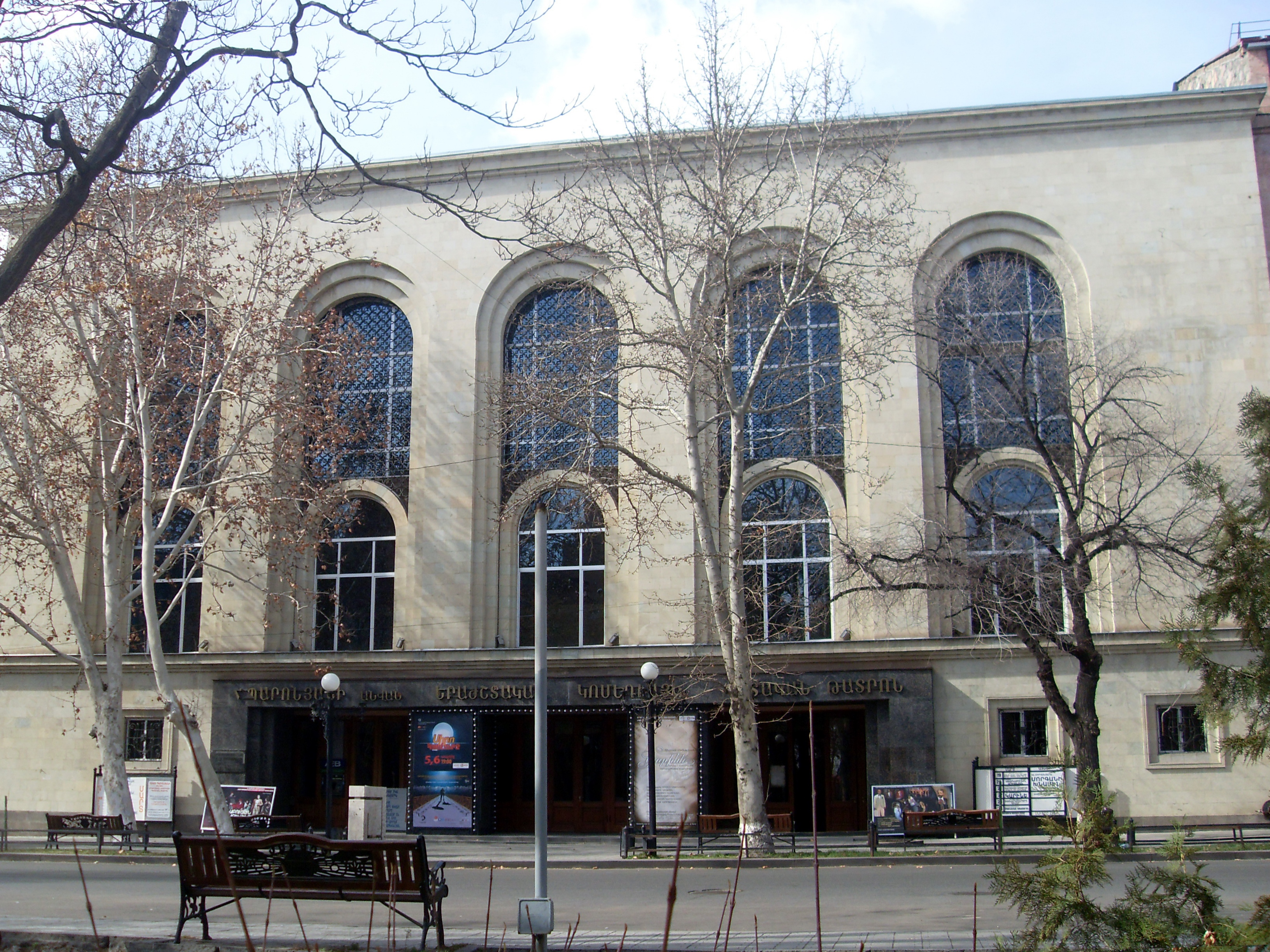
The facade of the building

- Sundukyan State Academic Theatre

== Links ==
- Official site
