= Assaf (name) =

Assaf is both a masculine given name and a surname. This spelling in English represents two unrelated names, Hebrew אָסָף /(ʔ)aˈsaf/ and Arabic عَسَاف /ʕa.saːf/, both of which can be used as given names and surnames. Notable people with the name include:

== Dynasty ==
- Assaf dynasty, the Turkmen rulers in Mount Lebanon during Mamluk and Ottoman era

== People with the given name ==
- Assaf Amdursky (born 1971), Israeli singer and producer
- Assaf Azo (born 1984), Israeli football player
- Assaf Bernstein (born 1970), Israeli film writer, director, and producer
- Assaf Cohen (born 1972), American actor
- Assaf Gavron (born 1968), Israeli writer, novelist, translator and musician
- Assaf HaRofeh, Hebrew medical writer known as Asaph the Jew
- Assaf Hefetz (born 1944), Israeli police commissioner
- Assaf Inbari (born 1968), Israeli writer, novelist, and journalist
- Assaf Kehati (born 1979), Israeli jazz guitarist, composer, bandleader and educator based in Boston
- Assaf Khalifa (born 1968), Syrian football player
- Assaf Kidron (born 1976), Israeli sculptor
- Assaf Kraus, Israeli musician, missFlag
- Assaf Lowengart (born 1998), Israeli baseball player
- Assaf Naor (born 1975), Czech-Israeli mathematician and computer scientist
- Assaf Abu Rahhal (1955–2010), Lebanese journalist
- Assaf Al-Qarni (born 1984), Saudi Arabian football player
- Assaf Ramon (1988–2009), Israeli pilot
- Assaf Rappaport (born 1983), Israeli billionaire businessman
- Assaf Schuster (born 1958), Israeli computer scientist
- Assaf Shaham (born 1983), Israeli artist
- Assaf Shelleg, Israeli-American musicologist and pianist
- Assaf Yaguri (1931–2000), Israeli soldier and politician

== People with the surname ==
- Ami Assaf (1903–1963), Israeli politician
- Joseph Assaf (born 1944), Australian businessman
- Mikhayl Assaf (1887–1970), archbishop of the Melkite Greek Catholic Church
- Mohammad Assaf (born 1989), Palestinian pop singer
- Rima Assaf (born 1970), Lebanese journalist and anchor
- Roger Assaf (born 1941), Lebanese playwright
- Roy Assaf (actor) (born 1979), Israeli actor
- Roy Assaf (choreographer) (born 1982), Israeli choreographer
- Roy Assaf (musician) (born 1982), Israeli jazz pianist and composer based in New York
- Samir Assaf (born 1960), Lebanese banker and businessman
- Walid Assaf (1960–2025), Palestinian politician
- Woodie Assaf (1917−2009), American weatherman
- Ibrahim Abdulaziz Al-Assaf (born 1949), Saudi Arabian politician

== See also ==
- Assef
- Asaf
- Asif
- Ossoff
