= Asifa =

Asifa may refer to:

== Organisations ==
- International Animated Film Association known also as ASIFA
  - ASIFA-Hollywood, an American non-profit organization in Los Angeles, California, branch member of the "Association Internationale du Film d'Animation" or "ASIFA" (the International Animated Film Association)
- Al-'Asifah, the mainstream armed wing of the Palestinian political party and militant group Fatah. Al-Asifah was jointly led by Yasser Arafat and Khalil Wazir

== People ==
- Aseefa Bhutto Zardari, Pakistani politician, and daughter of Pakistani prime minister Benazir Bhutto
- Asifa Bano, an 8-year-old girl abducted, raped, and murdered in Kathua, India; see the Kathua rape and murder case
- Asifa Quraishi or Asifa Quraishi-Landes, professor of law at the University of Wisconsin–Madison
- Asifa Zamani, Indian scholar of New Persian

== See also ==
- Asif, an Arabic male given name, masculine couterpart of Asifa
- Asaf, an Arabic male given name
- Asifabad (disambiguation)
