= Rima (given name) =

Rima is a feminine given name. Notable people with the name include:

== Given name ==
- Rima Abdelli (born 1988), Tunisian Paralympic athlete
- Rima Melati Adams (born 1980), Singaporean model, actress, singer and TV personality
- Rima Alamuddin (1941–1963), Lebanese–Swiss writer
- Rima Assaf (born 1970), Lebanese journalist and anchor
- Rima Ayadi (born 1989), French professional boxer
- Rima Bali (born 1969), Syrian writer
- Rima Baškienė (born 1960), Lithuanian politician
- Rima Batalova (born 1964), Russian politician and Paralympian track and field athlete
- Rima Beradze (born 1955), Georgian politician
- Rima Bishwokarma (born 1990), Nepalese film actress, model and television journalist
- Rima Butler (born 1997), Australian rugby league footballer
- Rima Das (born 1982), Indian filmmaker
- Rima Elkouri, Canadian journalist and writer
- Rima Fakih (born 1985), American professional wrestler and beauty pageant
- Rima Varzhapetyan-Feller, Armenian activist
- Rima Hassan (born 1992), French jurist and politician
- Rima Horton (born 1947), English former Labour Party councillor
- Rima Iraki (born 1982), Norwegian television presenter and news anchor
- Rima Kallingal (born 1984), Indian actress, dancer, and film producer
- Rima Karaki, Lebanese news anchor
- Rima Karami (born 1967), Lebanese politician
- Rima Kashafutdinova (born 1995), Kazakhstani sprinter
- Rima Khachatryan (1938–2020), Armenian educator and chemist
- Rima Khalaf (born 1953), Jordanian former government minister and United Nations official
- Rima Khelil (born 1989), Algerian team handball player
- Rima Maktabi (born 1977), Lebanese TV presenter and journalist
- Rima Abdul Malak (born 1979), French politician
- Rima Berns-McGown, South African born Canadian politician
- Rima Melati (1939–2022), Indonesian actress and singer
- Rima Nakhle, Australian-born New Zealand politician
- Rima Nazzal, Palestinian politician and author
- Rima Pipoyan (born 1988), Armenian choreographer, director, dancer and dance teacher
- Rima al-Qadiri (born 1963), Syrian Arab politician
- Rima Ramanuj, Indian television actress,
- Rima Raminfar (born 1970), Iranian actor and screenwriter
- Rima Sultana Rimu (born 2002), Bangladeshi women's rights activist
- Rima Rozen, Canadian geneticist
- Rima Salah (born 1943), Jordanian United Nations official
- Rima Sypkus (born 1967), Lithuanian-born Austrian handball player
- Rima Taha (born 1987), Jordanian sprinter
- Rima Valentienė (born 1978), Lithuanian professional basketball player
- Rima Vurobaravu (born 1968), Vanuatuan civil servant and banker
- Rima Wakarua (born 1976), Italian rugby union footballer and coach
- Rima Te Wiata (born 1963), British-born New Zealand singer, comedian and stage, film and television actress
- Rima Zeidan (born 1990), Taiwanese-Lebanese presenter, model and actress

== See also ==
- Rimma
- Rymma
