= Iraki =

Iraki is a native or inhabitant of Iraq. It may also refer to:

== Places ==
- Iraki, Republic of Dagestan, a rural locality in the Dakhadayevsky District, Republic of Dagestan, Russia

== People ==
- Ismael El Iraki (born 1983), French-Moroccan filmmaker
- Najwa El Iraki, Moroccan British businesswoman
- Rima Iraki (born 1982), Norwegian television presenter and news anchor
