= Rimma =

Rimma (Russian: Римма), Rymma (Ukrainian: Римма) or Ryma (Belarusian: Рыма) is a feminine given popular in Russia, Ukraine and Belarus that may refer to the following notable people:

- Rimma Aldonina (born 1928), Russian architect and children's poet
- Rymma Andreyeva, Ukrainian entomologist.
- Rymma Antonova, Ukrainian chess player.
- Rimma Belova (born May 1933), Soviet long track speed skater
- Rimma Bilunova (1940–2015), Russian chess player
- Rimma Brailovskaya (1877–1959), Russian painter
- Rymma Herasymova, Ukrainian archery athlete.
- Rymma Holubieva, Soviet and Ukrainian pianist, teacher.
- Rimma Ivanova (1894–1915), Russian nurse
- Rimma Kazakova (1932–2008), Russian poet
- Rimma Luchshenko (born 29 April 1993) was a road cyclist from Kazakhstan
- Rimma Markova (1925–2015), Russian film actress
- Rimma Komina (1926–1995), Russian literary critic
- Rimma Koshelyova (born 1936), Soviet hurdler
- Rimma Kuruch (1938–2019), Russian language educator
- Rymma Razumova, Ukrainian Soviet opera singer.
- Rymma Starostina, Ukrainian athlete.
- Rimma Wilms, German figure skater
- Rimma Zherder (1940–2021), Russian stage actress
- Rimma Zhukova (1925–1999), Russian speed skater
- Rymma Zyubina, Ukrainian theater and film actress.

== See also ==
- Rima (given name)
