= Asif =

- Pronunciation: Arabic: [aːsˤaf]
- Gender: Male
- Language: Arabic

Origin
- Origin: Hebrew and Arabic
- Meaning: the name of Solomon's vizier
- Region of origin: Arabia

Asif (Arabic: آصف) is an Arabic masculine given name. In Persian and Urdu it is often pronounced as 'Asif' or 'Asef'. This name referred to Solomon's vizier in the Islamic tradition, and by extension to a wise, prudential figure.

== People with this name ==
=== In antiquity ===
- Asif bin Barkhiya, described in the 27th Chapter of the Qur'an, transported the throne of the Queen of Sheba

=== In modern times ===
- Asif Ahmad Ali (1940–2022), Pakistani politician and government minister, Foreign Minister 1993–1996
- Asif Ahmad (born 1956), British diplomat
- Asif Akbar (born 1972), Bangladeshi singer
- Asif Ali (disambiguation), multiple people
- Asif Bashir (born 1993), Pakistani rescue worker
- Asif Bashir Bhagat (born 1976), Pakistani politician
- Asif Din (born 1960), English cricketer
- Asif Farrukhi (1959–2020), Pakistani doctor, writer and translator
- Asif Ismail (born 1970), Indian tennis player
- Asif Kapadia (born 1972), English film director
- Asif Maharammov (1952–1994), Azerbaijani Lieutenant colonel and National Hero of Azerbaijan
- Asif Mahmood (born 1975), Pakistani cricketer
- Asif Nawaz (1937–1993), Pakistani general
- Asif Noorani (born 1942), Pakistani newspaper and television writer
- Asif Iqbal Razvi (born 1943), Pakistani cricketer
- Asif Ali Zardari (born 1955), Pakistan's former president (2008–2013)

== Surname ==
- Bisma Asif (born 1995/96), Asian-Australian politician
- K. Asif (1922–1971), Indian film director
- Khawaja Muhammad Asif (born 1949), Pakistani politician
- Mohammad Asif (disambiguation), several people

== See also ==
- Assaf (name)
- Asaf
