= Ijaz Ahmed =

Ijaz Ahmed or Ejaz Ahmed may refer to:

- Ijaz Ahmed (cricketer, born 1949) (1949–1999), Pakistani cricketer
- Ijaz Ahmed (cricketer, born 1957), Pakistani cricketer
- Ijaz Ahmed (cricketer, born 1960), Pakistani cricketer
- Ijaz Ahmed (cricketer, born 1968), Pakistani international cricketer
- Ijaz Ahmed (cricketer, born 1969), Pakistani international cricketer
- Ijaz Ahmad (cricketer) (born 2004), Afghan cricketer
- Ejaz Ahmed Chaudhary (born 1956), Pakistan politician
- Ijaz Ahmed (wushu) (born 1981), Pakistani wushu practitioner
- Muhammed Ijaz Khan, Pakistani terrorist suspect formerly held at Guantanamo Bay
- Ejaz Ahmed (politician), Pakistani politician

== See also ==
- Ijaz Ahmed Chaudhry (disambiguation)
- Aijaz Ahmad (1941–2022), Indian philosopher
- Aijaz Ahmad Mir, Indian politician
