= PP-41 Mandi Bahauddin-II =

Constituency of the Punjabi Provincial Legislature, Pakistan

- Constituency for the Provincial Assembly of Punjab
- Region: Phalia Tehsil (partly) and Mandi Bahauddin Tehsil (partly) including Mangat Town in Mandi Bahauddin District

Current constituency
- Created from: PP-117 Mandi Bahauddin-II (2002-2018); PP-66 Mandi Bahauddin-II (2018-2023)

PP-41 Mandi Bahauddin-II (پی پی-41، منڈی بہاؤالدین-2) is a Constituency of Provincial Assembly of Punjab.

== General elections 2024 ==
Provincial election 2024: PP-41 Mandi Bahauddin-II
Party	Candidate	Votes	%	±%
Independent	Basma Riaz Choudhry (Note: Filed nomination papers as PTI candidate but ECP allowed him to run as an Independent)	70,494	44.20	
PML(N)	Syed Tariq Yaqoob	25,597	16.05	
PPP	Asif Bashir	21,352	13.39	
IPP	Muhammad Tariq Tarar	20,155	12.64	
TLP	Mohsin Raza	6,547	4.11	
JI	Abdul Rauf	5,835	3.66	
Independent	Muhammad Azam	3,912	2.45	
Independent	Chaudhary Shakeel Gulzar	3,144	1.97	
Others	Others (seventeen candidates)	2,459	1.53	
Turnout		163,923	54.17	
Total valid votes		159,495	97.30	
Rejected ballots		4,428	2.70	
Majority		44,897	28.15	
Registered electors		302,611		
hold				

== General elections 2018 ==
Provincial election 2018: PP-66 Mandi Bahauddin-II
Party	Candidate	Votes	%	±%
PTI	Muhammad Tariq Tarar	47,148	36.88	
PML(N)	Syed Tariq Yaqoob	39,822	31.15	
PPP	Muhammad Nawaz	15,141	11.84	
TLI	Liaqat Ali	10,656	8.34	
MMA	Ehtasham Gulfaraz Mangat	7,513	5.88	
TLP	Rahmaan Alli Tarar	4,486	3.51	
Others	Others (six candidates)	3,073	2.41	
Turnout		134,514	54.57	
Total valid votes		127,839	95.04	
Rejected ballots		6,675	4.96	
Majority		7,326	5.73	
Registered electors		246,522		

== General elections 2013 ==
Provincial election 2013: PP-117 Mandi Bahauddin-II
Party	Candidate	Votes	%	±%
PML(N)	Syed Tariq Yaqoob	30,537	28.60	
PML(Q)	Baasima Chaudhry	23,354	21.87	
PTI	Shakeel Gulzar	20,533	19.23	
PPP	Asif Bashir Bahgat	18,875	17.68	
Independent	Syed Shabir Hussain Sharazi	6,754	6.33	
JI	Syed Ijaz Hussain	4,872	4.56	
Others	Others (eight candidates)	1,841	1.72	
Turnout		109,652	60.79	
Total valid votes		106,766	97.37	
Rejected ballots		2,886	2.63	
Majority		7,183	6.73	
Registered electors		180,389		

== General elections 2008 ==
Provincial election 2008: PP-117 Mandi Bahauddin-II
Party	Candidate	Votes	%	±%
PPP	Asif Bashir Bhaghat	30,627	37.53	
PML(Q)	Basma Chaudhry	28,803	35.30	
PML(N)	Syed Tariq Yaqoob	21,682	26.57	
Independent	Ch. Baqir Hussain Bhatti	493	0.60	
Turnout		83,951	62.59	
Total valid votes		81,605	97.21	
Rejected ballots		2,346	2.79	
Majority		1,824	2.23	
Registered electors		134,119		

== See also ==
- PP-40 Mandi Bahauddin-I
- PP-42 Mandi Bahauddin-III
