= Aldonin =

Aldonin (Russian: Алдонин) is a Russian masculine surname, its feminine counterpart is Aldonina. The surname may refer to the following notable people:

- Evgeni Aldonin (born 1980), Russian football coach and a former player
- Rimma Aldonina (born 1928), Russian architect and children's poet
