= Constituency PP-117 =

Constituency of the Punjabi Provincial Legislature, Pakistan

Constituency PP-117 is a constituency of Provincial Assembly of the Punjab in Punjab, Pakistan.

The earlier name of this constituency was PP-99; it was changed for the 2008 elections.

== PP-117 Mandi Bahauddin-II ==
(Urdu: ii-پی پی 117 منڈی بہاوالدین)

== Brief introduction ==
There are eight union councils in the Provincial Assembly Constituency.

The last election of local bodies was held in 1991.

The total number of registered voters was 153,135 now in 2013. In the 2008 elections, the number of registered voters was 134,119.

== Main areas ==
- Phalia Town Committee
- The following Qanungo Halqas of Phalia tehsil:
  - Phalia-I)
  - Phalia-II)
  - Paharianwali
- Jokalian of Mandi Bahauddin District

== Elections results 2008 ==
- Registered voters: 134,119
- Polled: 81,562
- Valid votes: 81,605
- Rejected votes: 2,346
- Percentage of votes polled to registered voters: 60.81%

Asif Bashir Bhagat was elected as Member of Provincial Assembly of the Punjab (MPA) in 2008. He belongs to the Pakistan Peoples Party Parliamentarians (PPPP) political party.

Elections 2008
Contesters	Party	Votes polled
Asif Bashir Bhagat	PPPP	30,627
Basma Riaz Choudhry	PML-Q	28,803
Tariq Yaqoob Rizvi	PML-N	16,255
Baqir Hussain Bhatti	Independent	493

== Elections results 2013 ==
Elections 2013
Contesters	Party	Votes polled
Tariq Yaqoob Rizvi	PML-N	25,180
Shakil Gulzar	PTI	13,599
Asif Bashir Bhagat	PPPP	10,335
