= Assaf =

Assaf may refer to:

- Assaf (name), a given name and surname
- Assaf (sheep), a breed from Israel
- Academy of Science of South Africa (ASSAf)
- The Book of Assaf, the earliest medical book written in Hebrew (a misspelling of The Book of Asaph)
- Operation Assaf, an Israeli operation during the 1948 Arab-Israeli War

== See also ==
- Saint Asaph (died 601), Welsh Roman Catholic saint and bishop
- Asaf, includes a list of people with the name
