= NA-68 Mandi Bahauddin-I =

Constituency of the National Assembly of Pakistan

- Constituency for the National Assembly of Pakistan
- Region: Mandi Bahauddin Tehsil (partly) including Mandi Bahauddin city and Phalia Tehsil (partly) including Qadirabad village of Mandi Bahauddin District
- Electorate: 613,167

Current constituency
- Created: 2023
- Seats: 1
- Party: Pakistan Tehreek-e-Insaf
- Member: Imtiaz Ahmed Chaudhary
- Created from: NA-108 Mandi Bahauddin-I

NA-68 Mandi Bahauddin-I (این اے-68 منڈی بہاؤدین-۱) is a constituency for the National Assembly of Pakistan.

== Members of Parliament ==
=== 2018–2023: NA-85 Mandi Bahauddin-I ===
Election	Member	Party
2018	Imtiaz Ahmed Chaudhary	PTI

=== 2024–present: NA-68 Mandi Bahauddin-I ===
Election	Member	Party
2024	Imtiaz Ahmed Chaudhary	PTI

== Election 2002 ==
General elections were held on 10 October 2002. Ijaz Ahmed Chaudhry of PML-Q won by 70,675 votes.

General election 2002: NA-108 Mandi Bahauddin-I
Party	Candidate	Votes	%	±%
PML(Q)	Muhammad Ijaz Ahmed Chaudhary	70,060	40.36	
PPP	Zafarullah Tarar	60,424	34.81	
MMA	Syed Muhammad Mafooz Mushadi	37,422	21.56	
Others	Others (four candidates)	5,690	3.27	
Turnout		178,948	49.22	
Total valid votes		173,596	97.01	
Rejected ballots		5,352	2.99	
Majority		9,636	5.55	
Registered electors		363,575		

== Election 2008 ==
General elections were held on 18 February 2008. Muhammad Tariq Tarar of PPP won by 73,981 votes.

General election 2008: NA-108 Mandi Bahauddin-I
Party	Candidate	Votes	%	±%
PPP	Muhammad Tariq Tarar	73,951	40.49	
PML(N)	Muhammad Ijaz Ahmed Chaudhary	67,769	37.10	
PML(Q)	Zafarullah Tarar	39,789	21.78	
Others	Others (two candidates)	1,150	0.63	
Turnout		187,713	55.44	
Total valid votes		182,659	97.31	
Rejected ballots		5,054	2.69	
Majority		6,182	3.39	
Registered electors		338,597		
PPP gain from PML(Q)				

== Election 2013 ==
General elections were held on 11 May 2013. Muhammad Ijaz Ahmed Chaudhary (independent) won by 85,009 votes and became the member of National Assembly.

Ijaz Chaudhary left his National Assembly seat and joined PTI on 29 November 2014.

He was disqualified in fake degree case by the Supreme Court of Pakistan on 14 April 2015.

General election 2013: NA-108 Mandi Bahauddin-I
Party	Candidate	Votes	%	±%
Independent	Muhammad Ijaz Ahmed Chaudhary	85,009	35.48	
PML(N)	Mumtaz Ahmed Tarar	73,789	30.79	
PPP	Muhammad Tariq Tarar	29,883	12.47	
PTI	Zafarullah Tarar	25,406	10.60	
JI	Muhammad Riaz Farooq Sahi	18,270	7.62	
Others	Others (twelve candidates)	7,272	3.94	
Turnout		245,625	57.05	
Total valid votes		239,629	97.56	
Rejected ballots		5,996	2.44	
Majority		11,220	4.69	
Registered electors		430,517		
Independent gain from PPP				

== By-election 2015 ==
By elections were held on 8 June 2015 and Mumtaz Ahmed Tarar of PML-N won the slot with 70,638 votes.

By-election 2015: NA-108 Mandi Bahauddin-I
Party	Candidate	Votes	%	±%
PML(N)	Mumtaz Ahmed Tarar	75,402	41.81	
PTI	Muhammad Tariq Tarar	38,987	21.62	
PPP	Asif Bashir Bhagat	29,475	16.34	
JI	Muhammad Riaz Farooq Sahi	11,284	6.26	
PML(Q)	Ch. Hamza Nasir Iqbal	10,546	5.85	
Others	Others (six candidates)	14,647	8.12	
Turnout		183,672	42.59	
Total valid votes		180,341	98.19	
Rejected ballots		3,331	1.81	
Majority		36,415	20.19	
Registered electors		431,269		
PML(N) gain from Independent				

== Election 2018 ==
General elections were held on 25 July 2018.

General election 2018: NA-85 Mandi Bahauddin-I
Party	Candidate	Votes	%	±%
PTI	Imtiaz Ahmed Chaudhary	99,996	36.65	
PML(N)	Chaudhary Mushahid Raza	80,387	29.46	
PPP	Asif Bashir Bhagat	47,049	17.24	
Others	Others (ten candidates)	33,134	12.14	
Turnout		272,840	53.45	
Rejected ballots		12,274	4.51	
Majority		19,609	7.19	
Registered electors		510,468		
PTI gain from PML(N)				

== Election 2024 ==
General elections were held on 8 February 2024. Imtiaz Ahmed Chaudhary won the election with 166,229 votes.

General election 2024: NA-68 Mandi Bahauddin-I
Party	Candidate	Votes	%	±%
PTI	Imtiaz Ahmed Chaudhary (Note: Filed nomination papers as PTI candidate but ECP allowed him to run as an Independent)	166,229	55.81	▲19.16
PML(N)	Mushahid Raza	71,008	23.84	▼5.62
PPP	Asif Bashir Bhagat	20,394	6.85	▼10.39
TLP	Muhammad Akram Tahir	16,561	5.56	▲0.72
Others	Others (twenty candidates)	23,679	7.95	
Turnout		307,057	50.08	▼3.37
Total valid votes		297,871	97.01	
Rejected ballots		9,186	2.99	
Majority		95,221	31.97	▲24.78
Registered electors		613,167		

== See also ==
- NA-67 Hafizabad
- NA-69 Mandi Bahauddin-II
