= Ijaz Ahmed Chaudhry =

Ijaz Ahmed Chaudhry may refer to:

- Ijaz Ahmed Chaudhry (judge, born 1945)
- Ijaz Ahmed Chaudhry (judge, born 1950)
- Ejaz Chaudhary, politician, born 1956
- Muhammad Ijaz Ahmed Chaudhary, politician
- Chaudhry Ijaz Ahmad, Pakistani politician
