= Kidron =

Kidron may refer to:

- Kidron (surname)
- Qatra, thought to be the biblical site of Kidron mentioned in the first Book of Maccabees
- Kidron Valley, a valley near Jerusalem.
- Kidron, Israel, a moshav near Gedera, which is named after a biblical settlement.
- Kidron, Ohio, an unincorporated community in Wayne County, Ohio, United States
- Kidron, a horse ridden by General John J. Pershing.
