= Ori Azo =

Israeli footballer

Personal information
- Full name: Ori Natan Azo
- Date of birth: 17 July 2005 (age 21)
- Place of birth: Beit Shemesh, Israel
- Position: Left winger

Team information
- Current team: Beitar Jerusalem

Youth career
- 2015–2020: Maccabi Haifa
- 2016–2017: → Maccabi Tel Aviv
- 2020–2022: Maccabi Petah Tikva
- 2022–2024: Maccabi Tel Aviv

Senior career*
Years	Team	Apps	(Gls)
2023–	Maccabi Tel Aviv	0	(0)
2024–2025	→ Hapoel Ramat HaSharon	17	(7)
2025–2026	→ F.C. Ashdod	26	(4)
2026–	→ Beitar Jerusalem	0	(0)

International career^{‡}
2019	Israel U15	3	(0)
2021	Israel U17	3	(1)
2023–2024	Israel U19	8	(0)
2025–	Israel U21	1	(0)
- * Club domestic league appearances and goals as of 24 June 2026 ‡ National team caps and goals as of 17 March 2025

Ori Azo (Hebrew: אורי עזו; born 17 July 2005) is an Israeli footballer who plays as a left winger for Israeli Premier League club Beitar Jerusalem and the Israel national under-21 team.

== Career ==
=== Early career ===
Azo born in Beit Shemesh. Started to play football in the local academy under his uncle Ofir Azo. In the age of 10 signed for Maccabi Haifa. On 2020 scored a goal and achieved 4 million views on 433 account in Instagram.

In December 2020 signed for Maccabi Petah Tikva. In January 2022 moved to Maccabi Tel Aviv and on 14 April 2024 signed for 3 years for the club.

=== Senior career ===
In August 2024 loaned for Hapoel Ramat HaSharon. On 22 August 2024 made his senior debut in the 3–4 loss to Hapoel Kfar Shalem. In this match he also scored his debut goal. Until January 2025 scored 7 goals in 17 performances.

On 26 January 2025 signed for the Israeli Premier League club F.C. Ashdod. On 1 February 2025 made his debut in the Israeli Premier League and scored hisdebut goal in the 43rd minute in the 2–2 draw against Maccabi Petah Tikva.

== Career statistics ==
=== Club ===
As of 1 June 2026

Club	Season	League			State Cup		Toto Cup		Continental		Other		Total	
Club	Season	Division	Apps	Goals	Apps	Goals	Apps	Goals	Apps	Goals	Apps	Goals	Apps	Goals
Hapoel Ramat HaSharon	2024–25	Liga Leumit	17	7	1	1	0	0	–		0	0	18	8
F.C. Ashdod	2024–25	Israeli Premier League	11	2	1	0	0	0	–		0	0	12	2
F.C. Ashdod	2025–26	Israeli Premier League	15	2	0	0	0	0	–		0	0	15	2
Beitar Jerusalem	2026–27	Israeli Premier League	0	0	0	0	0	0	–		0	0	0	0
Career total			43	11	2	1	0	0	0	0	0	0	45	12
