= Imtiaz Ahmed Chaudhary =

Pakistani politician from Mandi Bahauddin District

Muhammad Imtiaz Ahmed Chaudhary

Member of the National Assembly of Pakistan
- Incumbent
- Assumed office 29 February 2024
- Constituency: NA-68 Mandi Bahauddin-I
- In office 13 August 2018 – 25 January 2023
- Constituency: NA-85 (Mandi Bahauddin-I)

Personal details
- Party: PTI (2018-present)
- Relations: Muhammad Ijaz Ahmed Chaudhary (brother)

Imtiaz Ahmed Chaudhry (Urdu: محمد امتیاز احمد چودھری) is a Pakistani politician who has been a member of the National Assembly of Pakistan since February 2024 and was previously elected to the National Assembly from August 2018 till January 2023.

== Political career ==
He was elected from the constituency NA-85 Mandi Bahauddin. He has served as a Chairman Public complaint Bureau with a former Prime Minister Shaukat Aziz from 2004 to 2007.
