= Kidron (surname) =

Kidron is a surname. Notable people with the surname include:

- Adam Kidron, British-born ex-music producer
- Anti Kidron (1943–2023), Estonian psychologist
- Assaf Kidron (born 1976), Israeli sculptor
- Beeban Kidron (born 1961), Baroness Kidron, British television and film director
- Michael Kidron (1930–2003), British cartographer and Marxist
- Peretz Kidron (1933–2011), Israeli peace activist
