= Ossoff =

Ossoff is a surname. Notable people with the surname include:

- Jon Ossoff (born 1987), U.S. Senator of Georgia
- Robert H. Ossoff, American physician-scientist and otolaryngologist
