= Asafu =

Asafu is both a given name and surname. Notable people with the name include:

- Asafu Tembo, Zambian judoka
- Kwame Asafu Adjei (born 1950), Ghanaian politician
- Ed Asafu-Adjaye (born 1988), English footballer
- Edward Asafu-Adjaye (1903–1976), Ghanaian political figure, lawyer, and diplomat

== See also ==
- Asaf
