= Asaf Duraković =

Croatian medical doctor and poet (1940–2020)

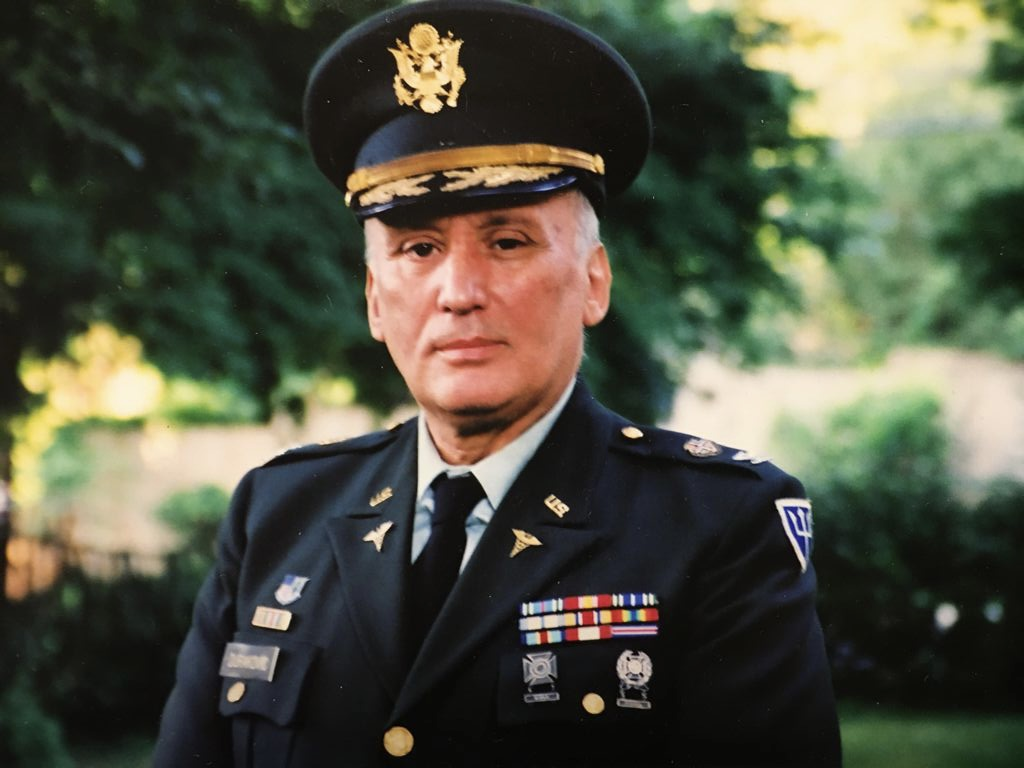

Asaf Duraković (16 May 1940 – 16 December 2020) was a Croatian medical doctor. He is also known for his poetry and verses.

== Early life and education ==
Duraković was born in Stolac, Bosnia and Herzegovina and educated at the University of Zagreb in Croatia where he earned both master's and doctoral degrees. During this time he worked at the Ruđer Bošković Institute. Afterwards he continued with post-doctoral work at Oxford University. In 1968 he migrated to Canada, where he attended McMaster University in Hamilton.

== Career ==
He worked at the University of Toronto, the University of Washington, and University of Rochester (UofR). He has been associated with the Croatian Literary Journal. Duraković is one of the co-founders of the Croatian Islamic Centre in Etobicoke, Toronto, the construction of which was finished on June 23, 1973. Its mosque is the oldest in Toronto. The minaret is Ottoman-style and it is the oldest minaret in Ontario.

In 1990, Duraković was one of the founders of the Croatian Muslim Democratic Party, formed in Zagreb. Dr. Duraković was a retired Colonel in the US Army Reserve. He worked at the VA hospital in Wilmington, Delaware.

Dr. Duraković also founded the World Life Institute, an international non-profit humanitarian organization based in Orleans County, New York. In addition, other World Life organizations inspired by Dr. Duraković have been established worldwide. World Life organizations can be found in Canada, Croatia, Denmark, Great Britain and South Africa.

== Works ==
=== Poetry ===
- Dark Sea-Weeds
- Smoke and Mist
- Paths of Ahasver

=== Politics ===
- From Bleiburg to Muslim Nation (Vedrina, Toronto, 1972)
- Status of Moslim People in Croatian National Community (Vedrina, Toronto, 1973)

== See also ==
- Uranium Medical Research Centre
