= Muhammad Tariq Tarar =

- محمد طارق تارڑ

Member of the National Assembly of Pakistan
- In office 18 February 2008 – May 2013
- President: Pervez Musharraf; Muhammad Mian Soomro (Acting); Asif Ali Zardari
- Prime Minister: Yusuf Raza Gillani

Member of the Provincial Assembly of the Punjab
- In office 15 August 2018 – 14 January 2023
- Constituency: PP-66 Mandi Bahauddin-II

Personal details
- Born: 13 May 1961 (age 65) Phalia, Punjab, Pakistan
- Party: PMLN (2025-present)
- Other political affiliations: IPP (2023-2025); PTI (2018-2023)
- Education: Bahauddin Zakariya University
- Profession: Agriculturist

Muhammad Tariq Tarar (Urdu: ًمحمد طارق تارڑ) (born 13 May 1961) is a Pakistani legislator and a former member of the National Assembly of Pakistan from Constituency NA-108 from 2008 to 2013. He was also a member of the Provincial Assembly of the Punjab from August 2018 to January 2023. He is from the village of Raike, Phalia, District Mandi Bahauddin, Punjab.

== Career ==
Tarar participated in all General Elections from 1990 until 2013. He lost his first General Election in 1990 against Pir Syed Mohammad Yaqoob Shah. In 1993 he was elected as a Member of Provincial Assembly, staying until 1996. In 2008 Tarar was elected Member of the National Assembly. He was Parliamentary Secretary of the Ministry of Environment from March 2009 – July 2011, and has been Federal Parliamentary Secretary for the Ministry of Information and Broadcast.

He lost his seat during the 2013 General Elections and came third with 13% of votes.

He was elected to the Provincial Assembly of the Punjab from PP-66 Mandi Bahauddin-II as a candidate of the Pakistan Tehreek-e-Insaf (PTI) in the 2018 Punjab provincial election.

He ran for a seat in the Provincial Assembly from PP-66 Mandi Bahauddin-II as a candidate of the PTI in the 2023 Punjab provincial election.
