= Raike =

Pakistani village

- Village and Union Council
- Location in Pakistan
- Coordinates: 32°25′48″N 73°36′27″E
- Country: Pakistan
- Region: Punjab
- District: Mandi Bahauddin
- Tehsil: Phalia

Population
  - Total: 7,000
- Time zone: UTC+5 (PST)
- General Post Office (GPOs): 40500
- Area code: 0456

Raike is a village and Union council of Phalia Tehsil, Mandi Bahauddin District, Punjab, Pakistan.

== Overview ==
=== Geography ===
It is located at an altitude of 205 metres above sea level and lies about 8 km west of Phalia on the Gujrat-Phalia Road. The nearest police station is Phalia Police Station, which is in Phalia.

=== Education ===
There are government-run Primary and Middle schools for both boys and girls, including: Government Middle School for Boys and Government Middle School for Girls. There are private schools as well. The literacy rate is increasing sharply.

=== Community ===
Population of village is round about 4,000. Most of the population are farmers by profession in this village. Muhammad Tariq Tarar Member of National Assembly of Pakistan & Parliamentary Secretary for Information and Broadcasting is also belongs from this village.
