= Muhammad Binyamin Rizvi =

Pakistani politician

Syed Binyamin Rizvi

Member of the Provincial Assembly & Advisor to the Chief Minister Punjab
- In office (1st Term Oct 1991) (2nd term 17 February 1997) – (1st term 18 April 1993) (2nd Term 12 October 1999)
- Preceded by: Shahbaz Sharif
- Succeeded by: Shahbaz Sharif

Minister of Social Welfare, Women Development and Bait-ul-Maal

Vice President of PML(N) punjab

Personal details
- Born: 15 August 1959 Phalia, Punjab, Pakistan)
- Died: 24 June 2004 (aged 44) Lahore, Pakistan
- Cause of death: Assassination by gunshots
- Party: Pakistan Muslim League (N)
- Children: 3
- Education: Government College of Technology, Lahore
- Profession: Politician

Pir Syed Binyamin Rizvi (Urdu: پیر سید محمد بنیامین رضوی) (15 August 1959 - 24 June 2004) was a Pakistani politician. He served as the Minister of Social Welfare, Women Development and Bait-ul-Maal, alongside the Advisor to the Chief Minister of Punjab. He also served as the Member of Provincial Assembly (MPA) during his first tenure. He was the eldest son of Pir Syed Mohammad Yaqoob Shah, and the elder brother to Syed Tariq Yaqoob Rizvi.

== Education ==
Rizvi received a degree in civil engineering from Government College of Technology, Lahore, in 1980 and a diploma from Allama Iqbal Open University in Islamabad.

== Political career ==
He was elected as a Member of the Provincial Assembly (MPA) of the Punjab in 1991 after his father death. And in 1997, he was re-elected as a MPA from PP-99. In his first term he served as an advisor to the Chief Minister Punjab in 1992, and in his second term he became Minister for Social Welfare, Women Development, and Bait-ul-Maal of Punjab until the proclamation of Emergency in 1999. In 2001, he became vice president of PML(N) Punjab and he held that seat until his death in 2004.

== Death ==
On 24 June 2004, Muhammad Binyamin Rizvi was shot and killed, along with his driver and bodyguard by unknown gunmen near the New Campus bridge in Lahore. He was buried next to his father in his hometown of Phalia.
