= PP-40 Mandi Bahauddin-I =

Constituency of the Punjabi Provincial Legislature, Pakistan

- Constituency for the Provincial Assembly of Punjab
- Region: Mandi

Current constituency
- Created from: PP-116 Mandi Bahauddin-I (2002-2018); PP-65 Mandi Bahauddin-I (2018-2023)

PP-40 Mandi Bahauddin-I (پی پی-40، منڈی بہاؤالدین-1) is a Constituency of Provincial Assembly of Punjab.

== General elections 2024 ==
Provincial election 2024: PP-40 Mandi Bahauddin-I
Party	Candidate	Votes	%	±%
Independent	Zarnab Sher (Note: Filed nomination papers as PTI candidate but ECP allowed him to run as an Independent)	74,514	53.56	
PML(N)	Hameeda Mian	46,149	33.17	
TLP	Syed Tasneem Hussain Shah	8,499	6.11	
PPP	Zohaib UI Hassan	4,872	3.50	
JI	Hassan Abbas	2,009	1.44	
Others	Others (seventeen candidates)	3,082	2.22	
Turnout		143,270	46.13	
Total valid votes		139,125	97.11	
Rejected ballots		4,145	2.89	
Majority		28,365	20.39	
Registered electors		310,556		
hold				

== General elections 2018 ==
Provincial election 2018: PP-65 Mandi Bahauddin-I
Party	Candidate	Votes	%	±%
PML(N)	Hameeda Mian	72,447	54.61	
PTI	Arshad Mahmood	46,356	34.94	
PPP	Chaudhry Azmat Ullah	7,129	5.37	
TLI	Muhammad Hamid Raza	3,352	2.53	
Independent	Chaudhry Naveed Ashraf	1,551	1.17	
Others	Others (six candidates)	1,840	1.38	
Turnout		138,622	52.52	
Total valid votes		132,675	95.71	
Rejected ballots		5,947	4.29	
Majority		26,091	19.67	
Registered electors		263,946		

== General elections 2013 ==
Provincial election 2013 : PP-116 Mandi Bahauddin-I
Party	Candidate	Votes	%	±%
PML(N)	Hameeda Mian	52,826	56.27	
Independent	Dewan Mushtaq Ahmad	19,650	20.93	
PPP	Tariq Mehmood	12,412	13.22	
PTI	Hafiz Abid Hanif	7,622	8.12	
Others	Others (nine candidates)	1,368	1.46	
Turnout		96,538	54.33	
Total valid votes		93,878	97.25	
Rejected ballots		2,660	2.75	
Majority		33,176	35.34	
Registered electors		177,687		

== General elections 2008 ==
Provincial election 2008 : PP-116 Mandi Bahauddin-I
Party	Candidate	Votes	%	±%
PPP	Tariq Mehmood Sahi	27,403	39.10	
PML(N)	Faiza Mustaq D/O Dewan Mushtaq Ahmed	22,799	32.53	
PML(Q)	Hameeda Waheed-Ud-Din	19,638	28.02	
PPP(SB)	Abdul Rouf Khan Afridi	155	0.22	
Independent	Muhammad Tariq	44	0.06	
Independent	Chaudhry Saqib Imran Advocate	28	0.04	
MQM-P	Amjad Hussain Lodhi	25	0.04	
Turnout		71,662	48.70	
Total valid votes		70,092	97.81	
Rejected ballots		1,570	2.19	
Majority		4,604	6.57	
Registered electors		147,163		

== See also ==
- PP-39 Hafizabad-III
- PP-41 Mandi Bahauddin-II
