= Mumtaz Ahmed Tarar =

Pakistani politician

- ممتاز احمد تارڑ

Minister for Human Rights
- In office 10 August 2017 – 31 May 2018
- President: Mamnoon Hussain
- Prime Minister: Shahid Khaqan Abbasi
- Succeeded by: Roshan Khursheed Bharucha

Member of the National Assembly of Pakistan
- In office 17 June 2015 – 31 May 2018
- Constituency: NA-108 (Mandi Bahauddin-I)
- In office 1997–1999
- Constituency: NA-83 (Mandi Bahauddin-cum-Gujrat)
- In office 1988–1990
- Constituency: NA-83 (Gujrat-IV)

Personal details
- Party: Pakistan Muslim League (N)

Mumtaz Ahmed Tarar (Urdu: ممتاز احمد تارڑ) is a Pakistani politician who served as Minister for Human Rights, in Abbasi cabinet from August 2017 to May 2018. He had been a member of the National Assembly of Pakistan, between 1988 and May 2018.

== Political career ==
He was elected to the National Assembly of Pakistan as a candidate of Pakistan Muslim League (N) (PML-N) from Constituency NA-83 (Gujrat-IV) in the 1988 general election. He received 50,520 votes and defeated a candidate of Pakistan Peoples Party (PPP).

He was re-elected to the National Assembly as a candidate of PML-N from Constituency NA-83 (Mandi Bahauddin-cum-Gujrat) in the 1997 general election. He received 64,233 votes and defeated a candidate of PPP.

He decided not to contest the 2002 general election and withdrew his nomination papers in favour of a candidate of Muttahida Majlis-e-Amal.

He did not contest the 2008 general election and withdrew his nomination papers in favour of an independent candidate Muhammad Ijaz Ahmed Chaudhary.

He ran for the seat of the National Assembly as a candidate of PML-N from Constituency NA-108 (Mandi Bahauddin-I) in the 2013 Pakistani general election but was unsuccessful. He received 73,789 votes and lost the seat to Muhammad Ijaz Ahmed Chaudhary.

He was re-elected to the National Assembly as a candidate of PML-N from Constituency NA-108 (Mandi Bahauddin-I) in by-elections held in June 2015, after the seat fell vacant following the disqualification of Muhammad Ijaz Ahmed Chaudhary over a forged academic certificate. He received 77,884 votes and defeated Tariq Tarar, a candidate of Pakistan Tehreek-e-Insaf.

Following the election of Shahid Khaqan Abbasi as Prime Minister of Pakistan in August 2017, Tarar was offered the cabinet portfolio of Ministry of Science and Technology, however he declined it. Later, he was inducted into the cabinet of Abbasi as Minister for Human Rights with the status of a federal minister. Upon the dissolution of the National Assembly on the expiration of its term on 31 May 2018, Tarar ceased to hold the office as Federal Minister for Human Rights.
