= Najwa El Iraki =

Moroccan British business-woman

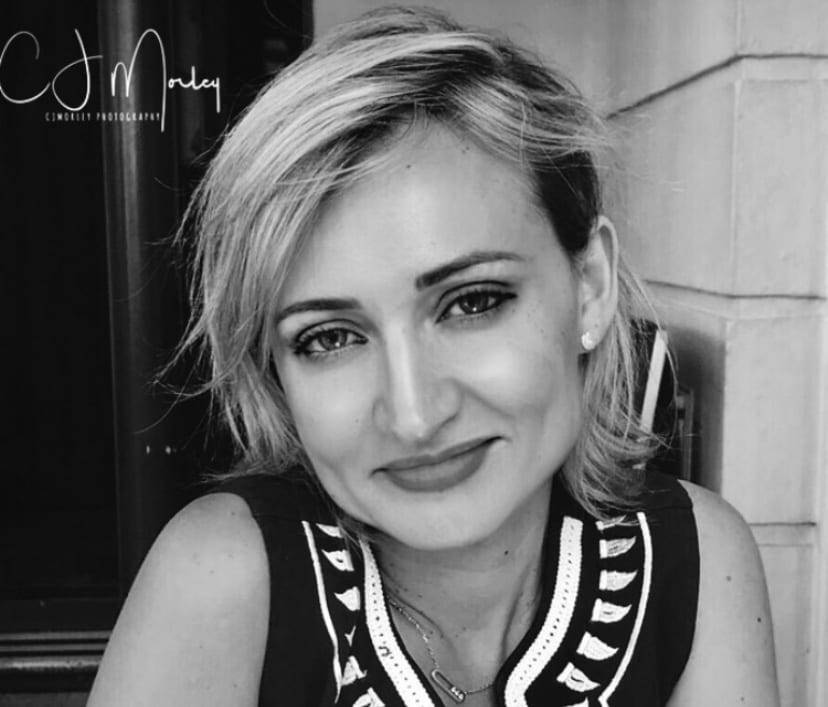
- Education: KEDGE Business School
- Occupations: Businesswoman, financial consultant
- Known for: Founder of AfricaDev Consulting
- Title: General Representative for North and West Africa, Lloyd's of London

Najwa El Iraki is a Moroccan British business-woman. She is the Founder and Managing Partner of AfricaDev Consulting Ltd. She is also the General Representative in North and West Africa of Lloyd's of London.

She is also the Managing Director for North and West Africa for Opportunity Network since 2017, a worldwide business-matchmaking platform.

Najwa El Iraki was named amongst the "60 Most Influential Women of Africa" by the New African Woman Magazine in 2016. In 2019, she was selected among the "Choiseul Africa", which regroups the top 200 African Leaders below 40, a ranking undertaken by Choiseul Africa & Forbes Africa.

In December 2020, Najwa was ranked in "Choiseul Africa" 100 African leaders for the second time. Her renewed ranking puts her in the top 10 Moroccan leaders, amongst which she is the first and only female entrepreneur.

== Education ==
Najwa El Iraki studied in France and in the United Kingdom. She holds a Master's degree in Business Management and Finance from Kedge Business School. Najwa was ranked in the Top 5% of students. When in the United Kingdom, she studied in Aston Business School. as well as in KPMG Tax Business School. She then qualified as a Chartered Accountant, CA in 2008 and became since a member of the international Institute of Chartered Accountants of Scotland (ICAS).

Najwa also holds a Leadership Management Certificate from Harvard Business School. She is also an alumna of the International Visitor Leadership Program, as she was selected to represent Morocco during the "Women & Entrepreneurship" English program organized by the US Department of State in 2019.

== Career ==
Najwa El Iraki began her early career in 2003 as an intern within KPMG Birmingham. She was then hired to work in KPMG London as a Consultant in Corporate Tax and Financial Structuring. After that, Najwa headed to the investment banking sector, joining the EMEA equity derivatives business of Lehman Brothers UK, which then got acquired by Normura Holdings. Following that experience, Najwa became Senior Manager at Mazars' Financial Services Group, in London.

In 2011, Najwa returns to Morocco to join the Moroccan Financial Board (which was then renamed Casablanca Finance City Authority) to be part of the initial team who built the international financial center in Morocco. She was nominated as the Head of Business Development of Casablanca Finance City Authority, a public-private organisation that aims to position Casablanca as the new financial and economic gateway to Africa. During the 6 years in which she occupied that position, Najwa managed to design the strategic development plan of Casablanca Finance City, advising investors and attracting more than 130 international companies to set up their regional headquarters in Casablanca. In 2017, Opportunity Networks appoints Najwa as the Managing Director of their new branch in Morocco, meant to cover their development across North and West Africa.

In the same year, Najwa launched AfricaDev Consulting Ltd, a company and a partnership network to assist multinationals, SMEs and family businesses in the process of planning, investing, executing, operating and developing a successful venture of business expansion and growth to Africa. AfricaDev Consulting gathers an international network of experts and consultants in the fields of business development, investment advisory, fund-raising, corporate finance, M&A and financial restructuring.

== Recognition & Awards ==
- Najwa El Iraki enters the list of the "60 Most Influential Women of Africa", by New African Woman Magazine, 2016.
- Najwa El Iraki is named "Financial Advisor North Africa of the Year 2016 - Consultancy Awards", by Corporate Vision Magazine UK.
- Najwa El Iraki is ranked amongst "Choiseul Africa", in the top 200 African leaders below 40 years old, by Choiseul Africa & Forbes Africa, 2019.
- Najwa El Iraki is attributed the "CEO of the Year Morocco 2020" Award, by Harvard Business Council, 2020.
- Najwa El Iraki is ranked amongst "Choiseul Africa", in the top 200 African leaders below 40 years old, for the second time, by Choiseul Africa & Forbes Africa, 2020.
- AfricaDev Consulting Ltd. wins "Best Business Development Consultancy", by Global Brands Magazine, 2020.

== Activities ==
Since 2013, Najwa El Iraki was invited as a guest speaker in a number of major international conferences and panel discussions, either as Head of Business Development for Casablanca Finance City or as Founder and Managing Director of AfricaDev Consulting Ltd., among which:

- "Morocco Unlocked: Strategy, Business and Regulatory Intelligence for New Investors", held by Financial Times, New York, 2013.
- "Morocco Trade & Investment Forum", held by CGEM, Dallas, 2014.
- The 18th Edition of the German-Arab Business Forum, Berlin, 2015.
- Africa Fund Forum, London, 2015.
- "Private Equity in Africa", held by EMPEA/Financial Times, London, 2015.
- 5th Euromed Capital Forum, Casablanca, 2015.
- Monte-Carlo Reinsurance RVs, Monaco, 2016.
- "The IV International Family Office Forum 2018", held by Financial Innovation Forum, Madrid, 2018.
- First Women Who Lead Conference, Dubai, 2018.
- "Startup conference - Heroes meet in Maratea", Italy, 2019.
- "The New Africa Business Development Forum", MedaWeek, held by Mediterranean Week of Economic Leaders, Barcelona, 2019.
- Young Job Network Forum, Ivory Coast, 2019
- African Investment Conference (AFSIC), London, 2016 to 2021, of which she later became Ambassador for Francophone Africa in 2020.

Najwa has also written various articles for Business journals and magazines, some of them being:

- "The Next Pinnacle in Investment" for Banker Africa.
- "The African Business Ecosystem and Advice for Entrepreneurs and Investors" for Business Africa Online.
- "Casablanca Finance City Hub for Africa" for Zawya.
- "Desafíos y Oportunidades para las Fusiones y Adquisiciones en la etapa Post Covid" for Marruecos Negocios.

== Community Involvement ==
Najwa El Iraki is a mentor for HEC Paris Executive Education since 2019. She is involved in a wide range of Moroccan and African business networks and associations. She is in particular the co-founder of CasaExpats in 2015, the first Elite network to connect English speaking expatriates with their Moroccan peers. She is also an active member of a number of women associations, such as Women Working for Change of the Africa CEO Forum, Lean In and Al-Sahm Women. As a business leader, Najwa aims to join forces with other women to address gender inequality particularly in developing and advocating women's leadership in the African private sector.
