= Asif Ali =

Asif Ali may refer to:

- Asif Ali (auditor general), Comptroller and Auditor General of Bangladesh 2003–2008.
- Asif Ali (actor) (born 1986), Indian film actor and producer.
- Asif Ali (comedian) (born c. 1988), American comedian and actor.
- Asif Ali (cricketer), batsman for Pakistan.
- Asif Ali Haider Khan, recipient of the Sangeet Natak Akademi Award for theatre.

== See also ==
- Asaf Ali (1888–1953), Indian independence fighter, lawyer and ambassador
- Asif Ahmad Ali (1940–2022), Pakistani politician
- Asif Ali Khan Durrani, Pakistani ambassador
- Asif Ali Malik (born 1948), Pakistani lawyer
- Asif Ali Zardari (born 1955), former Pakistani president
