= Asifabad =

Asifabad may refer to:

- Asifabad, Telangana, a town and the headquarters of Komaram Bheem district, Telangana, India
- Asifabad (Assembly constituency), constituency of Telangana Legislative Assembly, India
- Asefabad, Kurdistan, also known as Āsifābād, a village in Kurdistan Province, Iran

== See also ==
- Asif Nagar, a mandal (subdistrict) in Telangana, India
- Asifa (disambiguation)
- Asif, an Arabic male given name
- Abad (disambiguation)
