= Mohammad Yaqoob Shah =

Pakistani politician and religious leader

Pir Syed Mohammad Yaqoob Shah
- پیر سید محمد یقوب شاہ

Member of the Provincial Assembly, Personal Secretary C.M of punjab Ghulam Haider Wayne
- In office 24th October, 1986 – 30th August, 1991

Personal details
- Born: Phalia, Punjab, Pakistan
- Party: Pakistan Muslim League
- Children: Pir Syed Muhammad Binyamin Rizvi
- Profession: Politician, religious scholar

Pir Syed Mohammad Yaqoob Shah (Urdu: پیر سید محمد یقوب شاہ) was a Pakistani Member of the Provincial Assembly of the Punjab. He was a spiritual leader, religious scholar and one of the leading members of the Sunni Islam community in the Gujrat and Mandi Bahauddin regions of Pakistan. He was elected as Member of Provincial Assembly (MPA) in the 1990 Pakistani general election, but died soon after in 1991. His elder son, Pir Syed Muhammad Binyamin Rizvi was elected in the by-elections held to fill the vacant seat.

== History ==
He contested and won in the general elections of 1990 and became Member of the Provincial Assembly in his constituency of PP-99 in Phalia as a candidate of PML. During his tenure, he was also selected as Advisor to Punjab Chief Minister Ghulam Haider Wyne and later, was named as a part of Wyne's cabinet.

== Family ==
Pir Syed Yaqoob Shah had two sons continuing his political legacy. His elder son's name was Pir Syed Muhammad Binyamin Rizvi. a former member of the Provincial Assembly of the Punjab. Pir Yaqoob Shah’s younger son is named Syed Tariq Yaqoob Rizvi who is currently a member of (PML-N).
