= Iraki, Republic of Dagestan =

Iraki Ираки Иракьи
- Selo
- Location within Republic of Dagestan Location within Russia
- Coordinates: 42°09′N 47°43′E
- Country: Russia
- Region: Republic of Dagestan
- District: Dakhadayevsky District
- Time zone: UTC+3:00

Iraki (Russian: Ираки; Dargwa: Иракьи) is a rural locality (a selo) in Dibgashinsky Selsoviet, Dakhadayevsky District, Republic of Dagestan, Russia. The population was 391 as of 2010. There are 2 streets.

== Geography ==
Iraki is located 11 km east of Urkarakh (the district's administrative centre) by road. Dibgashi and Kalkni are the nearest rural localities.
