= Rima Salah =

Palestinian-Jordanian academic researcher

Rima Salah is a Palestinian-Jordanian academic researcher, who holds a number of positions in international advocacy for conflict resolution and the rights of women and children. She is an assistant clinical professor at the Yale Child Study Center, and currently the chair of the Early Childhood Peace Consortium (ECPC).

She is also a member of the international advisory council of the Academic University College for Nonviolence and Human Rights in Beirut, Lebanon, the United Nations High-Level Panel on Peace Operations., and sits on the board of directors at Women for Women International, the Global Network for Women Peacebuilders, and Cure Violence Global.

== Early life and education ==
Salah is a national of Jordan and speaks Arabic, English, and French. She holds a Ph.D. in cultural anthropology from SUNY-Binghamton. During her doctoral program, Salah spent one year in Baqa'a Palestinian Refugee Camp near Amman, Jordan conducting research for her PhD dissertation that examined the changing status of three generations of Palestinian women in refugee camps with regards to education and public/community participation. She also holds master's degrees in education and sociology and cultural anthropology from SUNY-Fredonia, and an undergraduate degree in sociology and social work from Beirut College for Women-Lebanon (now known as the Lebanese American University).

Salah began her career as a teacher in the Jordanian Government Public School System in 1965. Upon leaving the teaching profession, Salah worked for the Catholic Relief Services in Jerusalem as a supervisor of social workers for the organization's Humanitarian Programs for Refugees and Displaced People from 1967 to 1975.

From 1972 to 1987, Salah lectured on topics including social work, sociology, psychology, and Arabic at various institutions and organizations, including the School of Social work at Dar al-Tifl al-Arabi in Jerusalem, the Swedish Organization of Individual Relief in Jerusalem, the State University of New York at Binghamton, and Binghamton Community College in Binghamton, New York.

== International advocacy career ==
=== United Nations positions ===
Salah joined UNICEF in 1987 as Head of Office in Baluchistan, Pakistan. After five years in Pakistan, Salah became the UNICEF Representative in Ouagadougou, Burkina Faso from 1992 to 1995 and the UNICEF representative in Hanoi, Vietnam, from 1995 to 1999.

From 1999 to 2004 she was UNICEF's regional director for West and Central Africa. Between 2004 and 2007 she was deputy executive director of UNICEF, based in New York City. She was deputy special representative of the Secretary-General at the United Nations Mission in the Central African Republic and Chad from 2008 to 2010. Salah returned to UNICEF New York headquarters from 2011 to 2012 as the deputy executive director, officer-in-charge for external relations.

As an advocate for the rights of children and women in armed conflict and post-conflict situations, Salah contributed to Security Council (SC) Resolution 1612 on child rights violations (2005) and Security Council (SC) resolution 1325 Women, Peace, and Security (2000).

On October 31, 2014, Salah was appointed by Ban Ki-moon, Secretary-General of the United Nations, to join the 14-member United Nations High-Level Independent Panel on Peace Operations, convened to review current and future United Nations peace operations and their role in the prevention and resolution of conflicts. In May 2016, the panel presented the results of their six-month evaluation at the 70th General Assembly on Peace and Security at the United Nations.

=== Early Childhood Peace Consortium ===
In 2012, Salah co-founded the Early Childhood Peace Consortium (ECPC), a network of stakeholders across sectors who champion peace-building and violence prevention through an Early Childhood Development (ECD) agenda.

Salah, along with ECPC member James F. Leckman, and Yale University professor Catherine Panter-Brick, co-edited the book Pathways to peace: The transformative power of children and families, investigating "the way that children are raised as a critical factor that can inform a community's tendency toward peace versus conflict".

In October 2015, Salah was elected as the ECPC's inaugural chair.

== Awards and honors ==
In 2019, Salah received the Recognition and Gratitude in Advocating for Children's Rights Around the World Award from Juzoor for Health and Social Development, an NGO based in Ramallah, Palestine, and the Palestinian Health Policy Forum.

On September 23, 2021, Salah was awarded the 2021 Peacemaker Award from the Center for Peace and Conflict Resolution (CPCR) at the J. Reuben Clark Law School at Brigham Young University.
