= Muhammad Ijaz Ahmed Chaudhary =

Pakistani politician

- محمد اعجازاحمدچوہدری

Member of the National Assembly of Pakistan
- In office 1 June 2013 – 2014
- Constituency: NA-108 (M.B.Din-I)
- In office 2002–2007
- Constituency: NA-108 (M.B.Din-I)

Personal details
- Relations: Imtiaz Ahmed Chaudhary (brother)

Muhammad Ijaz Ahmed Chaudhary (Urdu: محمد اعجاز احمد چودھری) is a Pakistani politician who had been a member of the National Assembly of Pakistan from 2002 to 2007 and again from June 2013 to 2014.

== Political career ==
He was elected to the National Assembly of Pakistan as a candidate of Pakistan Muslim League (Q) (PML-Q) from Constituency NA-108 (M.B.Din-I) in the 2002 Pakistani general election. He received 70,060 votes and defeated Zafarullah Tarar, a candidate of Pakistan Peoples Party (PPP).

He ran for the seat of the National Assembly as a candidate of Pakistan Muslim League (N) (PML-N) from Constituency NA-108 (M.B.Din-I) in the 2008 Pakistani general election, however remained unsuccessful and lost the seat to Muhammad Tariq Tarar. He received 67,769 votes and lost the seat to Muhammad Tariq Tarar.

He was re-elected to the National Assembly as an independent candidate from Constituency NA-108 (M.B.Din-I) in the 2013 Pakistani general election. He received 85,009 votes and defeated Mumtaz Ahmed Tarar.

He was disqualified to continue in office because of fake degree case and human smuggle charges and thus unseated. In 2017, he was sentenced to three-year imprisonment in fake degree case.
