= Mohammad Asif =

Mohammad or Muhammad Asif may also refer to:

- Mohammed Asif (sailor) (born 1994), Indian sailor
- Mohammad Asif (cricketer) (born 1982), Pakistani cricketer
- Mohammad Asif (umpire) (born 1973), Pakistani cricket umpire
- Mohammad Asif (Omani cricketer) (born 1970), Pakistan-born Omani cricketer
- Mohammad Asif (politician), Tamil Nadu politician and minister
- Mohammad Asif Shazada (1919–1998), former Afghan field hockey player
- Mohammad Asif Nang (born 1972), Afghan governor of Farah Province
- Mohammad Asif Rahimi (born 1959), Afghan politician
- Mohammad Asif Kohkan (born 1936), former Afghan wrestler
- Muhammad Rizwan Asif (born 1990), Pakistani footballer
- Muhammad Asif (baseball) (born 1986), Pakistani baseball player
- Muhammad Asif (snooker player) (born 1982), Pakistani snooker player
- Sardar Muhammad Asif Nakai (born 1958), Pakistani politician
- Muhammad Asif Sandila (born 1954), former Pakistani Chief of Naval Staff
- Khawaja Muhammad Asif (born 1949), Pakistani minister and politician
- Muhammad Asif Mohseni (1935–2019), Shia Twelver clergy
