= Rimma Ivanova =

Rimma Mikhailovna Ivanova
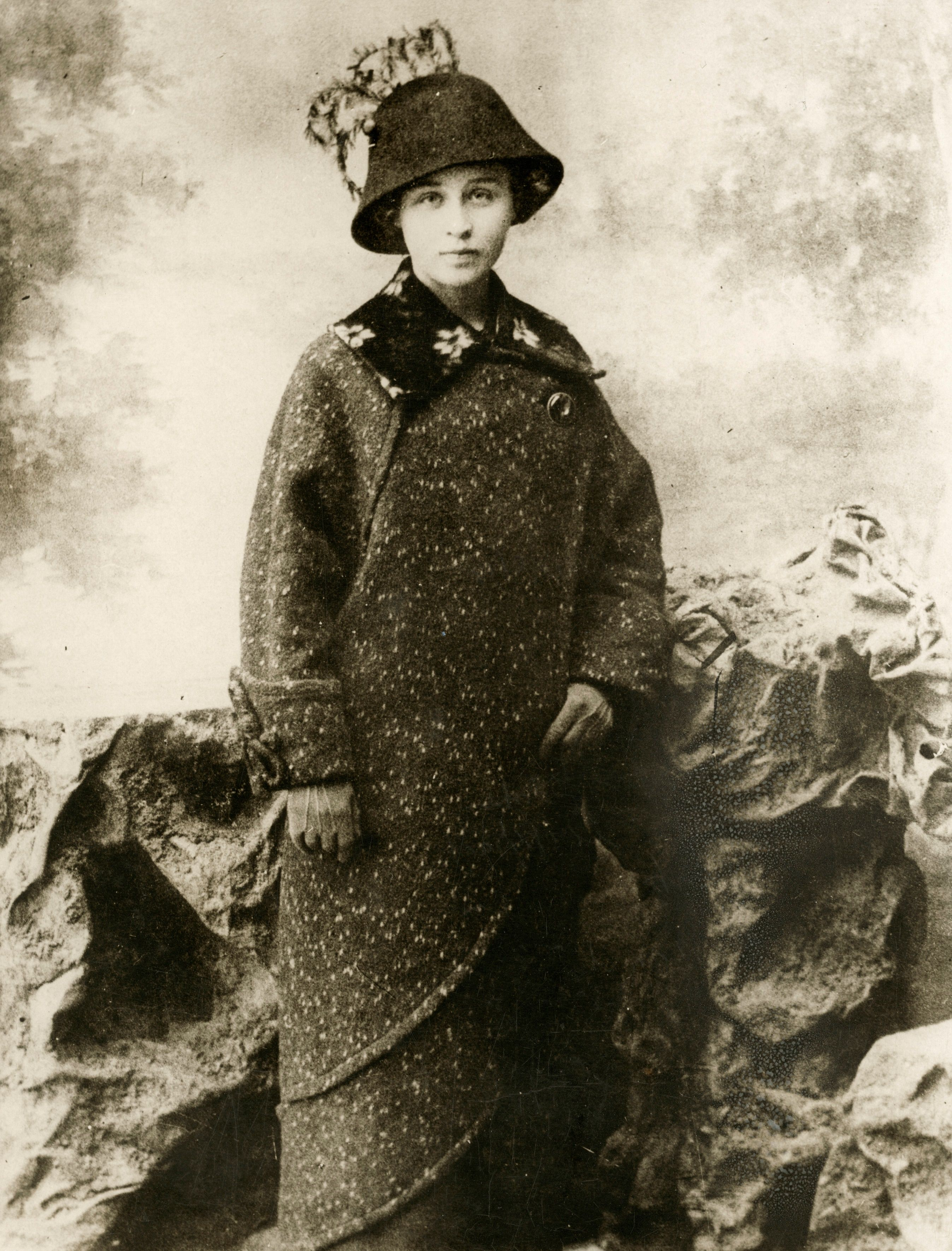
- Born: June 27, 1894; Stavropol
- Died: September 22, 1915 (aged 21); Mokraya Dubrova
- Occupation: nurse
- Awards: Order of St. George 4th Class; Cross of St. George 4th Class; Medal of St. George 3rd Class; Medal of St. George 4th Class

Rimma Mikhailovna Ivanova (Russian: Римма Михайловна Иванова; 27 June 1894 – 22 September 1915) was a Russian nurse, participant of the First World War. She was the only woman in the Russian Empire, awarded the military Order of St. George 4th Class.

== Live ==
Rimma Ivanova was born in 1894 in Stavropol. In 1913 she finished the Olginskaya Women's Gymnasium of Stavropol. She worked as a zemstvo school teacher in the village of Petrovskoye (now Svetlograd town). After the outbreak of the First World War, she entered the nurses' courses in Stavropol. In January 1915 she volunteered as a nurse in the Russian army. She was awarded the Cross of St. George 4th Class and two Medals of St. George for the rescue of the wounded soldiers from the battlefield.

== Death ==
On September 22, 1915 Rimma Ivanova helped the wounded soldiers during the battle near the village of Mokraya Dubrova (now in Pinsk District, Brest Region, Belarus). When both officers of the company were killed in the battle, she raised the company in an attack and rushed to the enemy trenches. The position was taken, but Ivanova herself was seriously injured and died.

By the decree of Nicholas II of Russia, as an exception, Rimma Ivanova was posthumously awarded an officer's Order of St. George 4th Class.

She was buried in Stavropol near the St. Andrew's Church on September 24, 1915.

== Memory ==
The street in Stavropol is named after Rimma Ivanova. Monuments to Rimma Ivanova were erected in Stavropol and Mikhailovsk.
