= Basma Riaz Choudhry =

Pakistani politician

Basma Riaz Choudhry بسمہ ریاض چوہدری

Member of the Provincial Assembly PML(Q)
- In office 10 October 2002 – 2008
- Preceded by: Parvez Elahi
- Succeeded by: Parvez Elahi

Personal details
- Born: 5 March 1977 (age 49) Chicago, United States
- Party: PTI (2023-present)
- Other political affiliations: PML(Q) (2002-2023)
- Children: 2
- Relatives: Chaudhry family
- Profession: Politician

Basma Riaz Choudhry also spelt Baasima (Urdu: بسمہ ریاض چوہدری) is a Member of the Provincial Assembly (MPA) of Punjab. She is the daughter of Chaudhry Riaz Asghar, brother-in-law of Chaudhry Shujaat Hussain. The first time she was elected as an MPA was in the by-election in 2005. She took part in the 2008 general elections from the PP-117 constituency (Mandi Bahuddin-II) as a candidate of Pakistan Muslim League (Q), but was defeated by the PPP candidate Asif Bashir Bhagat. Then, she returned to Punjab Assembly in the 2013 general elections but was defeated by the PMLN candidate Syed Tariq Yaqoob Rizvi. She was selected to be a part of the seats reserved for women in 2013 and 2018.

Chaudhry was born on March 5, 1977, in Chicago and holds American citizenship. She returned to Pakistan to contest the 2024 general elections in which she succeeded in quite a shocking and controversial fashion, receiving over 70,000 votes. She is the niece of Shujaat Hussain.
