= Assaf Azo =

Israeli footballer

Assaf Azo אסף עזו
Personal information
- Full name: Assaf Azo
- Date of birth: May 17, 1984 (age 42)
- Place of birth: Beit Shemesh, Israel
- Position: Midfielder

Team information
- Current team: Ironi Beit Shemesh

Youth career
- Hapoel Jerusalem

Senior career*
Years	Team	Apps	(Gls)
2001–2012	Hapoel Jerusalem	188	(2)
2009–2010	→ Beitar Shimshon Tel Aviv (loan)	32	(1)
2012–2014	Hapoel Katamon	60	(0)
2014–	Ironi Beit Shemesh	183	(29)
- * Club domestic league appearances and goals as of 1 November 2023

Assaf Azo (Hebrew: אסף עזו; born May 17, 1984) is an Israeli footballer who plays in Ironi Beit Shemesh

His brother is the footballer Ofir Azo.

== Honours ==
- Third Division:
  - Winner (3): 2001–02, 2007–08, 2010–11
