= Ijaz Ahmed Chaudhry (judge, born 1950) =

Pakistan judge (born 1950)

Ijaz Ahmed Chaudhry اعجاز احمد چوہدری

Justice Supreme Court of Pakistan
- In office 17 November 2011 – 14 December 2015

Chief Justice Lahore High Court
- In office 9 December 2010 – 16 November 2011

Additional Advocate General Punjab
- In office 1999 – May 2001

Assistant Advocate General Punjab
- In office 1988–1995

Personal details
- Born: December 12, 1950 Shakargarh, Pakistan

Ijaz Ahmed Chaudhry (Urdu: اعجاز احمد چوہدری; born 12 December 1950) is a retired justice of the Supreme Court of Pakistan who was formerly chief justice of the Lahore High Court. Before his elevation as a judge of the Lahore High Court, he served as an additional Advocate General Punjab, representing the Government of Punjab. Earlier, he remained Assistant Advocate General Punjab from 1988 to 1995.

== Early life ==
Ijaz Ahmed Chaudhry is the son of Chaudhry Abdul Aziz and was born in village Jabbal, Tehsil Shakargarh, District Narowal on 12 December 1950. He was educated at Government Islamia College, Civil Lines, Lahore. After receiving a Bachelor of Laws, Justice Ijaz Ahmad Chaudhry started practicing law in 1975 and was enrolled as an Advocate High Court in 1977. He ascended to be an Advocate Supreme Court in 1992.

== Professional career ==
Ijaz Ahmed Chaudhry served as:

- Special Prosecutor, Sessions Court, Lahore (from 1977 to 1979)
- Legal Advisor NDFC, various Banks and Companies (1988)
- Assistant Advocate General Punjab (from 1988 to 1995)
- Additional Advocate General, Punjab (from 1999 to May 2001)

He was raised to the Bench at Lahore High Court on 2 May 2001. His responsibilities have included:

- Inspection Judge, Lahore District
- Member Administration Committee, Lahore High Court, Lahore
- Cooperative Judge, Lahore High Court, Lahore
- Appellate Judge, Customs
- Administrative Judge, Anti Terrorism Courts in Punjab
- Administrative Judge, Anti Corruption Courts in Punjab
- Administrative Judge, Drug Courts in Punjab
- Led a delegation of the Judicial Officers to Vienna and Germany in November 2009 on a study tour on International Cooperative in Terrorism Cases/Drugs and Crimes arranged by the United Nations Office
- Chairman, Committee for Enrollment of Advocates Supreme Court of Pakistan
- Member Syndicate, University of the Punjab
- Member Syndicate Committee, Punjab University Law College
- Member Board of Management, Punjab Judicial Academy
- Chairman Board of Management, Punjab Judicial Academy
- Member Board of Governors, Federal Judicial Academy

Some of the landmark judgments delivered by him as Judge of the Lahore High Court are (1) Mukhtaran Mai’s case, (2) Namoos-e-Risalat case, (3) Dr. Abdul Qadeer Khan’s case and (4) Hafiz Saeed Ahmad’s case. He came to worldwide media attention in May 2010 when he ordered that Facebook be blocked in Pakistan, and then restored access after a page with caricatures of Muhammad was removed.

Having served as Judge of the Lahore High Court for more than 9 years, Hon’ble Mr. Justice Ijaz Ahmed Chaudhry was appointed Chief Justice of Lahore High Court on 9 December 2010, and elevated as Judge of the Supreme Court on 17 November 2011. He was among the leading characters of the historic movement for restoration of Judiciary who refused to take oath under the PCO.

He retired from the Supreme Court on 14 December 2015.
