= Ofir Azo =

Israeli footballer (born 1982)

Ofir Azo אופיר עזו
Personal information
- Full name: Ofir Azo
- Date of birth: October 14, 1982 (age 44)
- Place of birth: Beit Shemesh, Israel
- Position: Midfielder

Team information
- Current team: Ironi Beit Shemesh

Youth career
- Hapoel Jerusalem

Senior career*
Years	Team	Apps	(Gls)
1999–2004	Hapoel Jerusalem		
2004–2006	Beitar Jerusalem	40	(3)
2006–2007	Maccabi Petah Tikva	5	(0)
2007	Hapoel Jerusalem	17	(1)
2007–2008	Hakoah Amidar Ramat Gan	7	(1)
2008–2009	Hapoel Jerusalem	38	(1)
2009–2010	Maccabi Be'er Sheva	32	(2)
2010–2014	Hapoel Jerusalem	111	(20)
2014–2015	Hapoel Marmorek	5	(0)
2015–2018	Hapoel Jerusalem	41	(0)
2018	Ironi Beit Shemesh	9	(5)
2018–2019	Hapoel Jerusalem	6	(0)
2019–	Ironi Beit Shemesh	54	(14)

Managerial career
- 2018–2019: Hapoel Jerusalem
- * Club domestic league appearances and goals as of 1 November 2023

Ofir Azo (Hebrew: אופיר עזו; born October 14, 1982) is an Israeli footballer who plays in Ironi Beit Shemesh.

His brother is the footballer Assaf Azo.

== Career ==
On 14 August 1999 Azo made his senior debut in Hapoel Jerusalem. On 24 March 2000, he scored his debut goal in the 3–1 win against Hapoel Rishon LeZion.

On 24 October 2003, he joined the urban rival Beitar Jerusalem and played for Beitar 3 seasons.

In summer 2006, he signed for 3 season in Maccabi Petah Tikva, but later in the season returned to Hapoel Jerusalem.

== Honours ==
- Third Division:
  - Winner (2): 2001–02, 2010–11
- Second Division:
  - Winner (1): 2007–08
