= Rimma Wilms =

German figure skater

Rimma Wilms is a retired German figure skater, who won the German Championship in the Junior Ladies B category in 2000. She placed fourth at the Heiko Fischer Cup among Junior Ladies in 1998, and retired from competition in 2001 after a 23rd place finish at the German Figure Skating Championships. In 2010, Rimma co-founded a non-profit charitable organization, Esperance For All, in New York and organized an event at The Westchester Mall. At the event, hearing-impaired and deaf children met with an American Sign Language-speaking Santa Claus.
