= Syed Tariq Yaqoob Rizvi =

Pakistani politician

Member of the Provincial Assembly of the Punjab
- In office 29 May 2013 – 31 May 2018

Personal details
- Born: 1 December 1968 (age 57) Phalia, Punjab, Pakistan
- Party: PMLN

Syed Tariq Yaqoob Rizvi is a Pakistani politician who was a Member of the Provincial Assembly of the Punjab, from May 2013 to May 2018. He is the son of Pir Syed Mohammad Yaqoob Shah and the younger brother of Pir Syed Muhammad Binyamin Rizvi.

== Early life and education ==
Syed Tariq Yaqoob Rizvi was born on December 1, 1968 in Phalia. He graduated in 1988 from Forman Christian College and earned a degree in Bachelor of Arts.

== Political career ==
He was elected to the Provincial Assembly of the Punjab as a candidate of Pakistan Muslim League (Nawaz) from Constituency PP-117 (Mandi Bahauddin-II) in the 2013 Pakistani general election.

During his tenure, Syed Tariq Yaqoob Rizvi instituted various projects and aided in changing the landscape of the city of Phalia. Rizvi established the first Maternity Hospital in Phalia alongside Rescue 1122 emergency services. He also inaugurated the first ever floodlight cricket stadium in the city which is named after his father, Pir Syed Mohammad Yaqoob Shah. A large number of schools got upgraded in his tenure and were provided with supplemental facilities. Rizvi also established six carpeted roads in his constituency.
