= Roy Assaf (musician) =

Israeli jazz pianist and composer

Roy Assaf רועי אסף
- Born: 1982; Beersheba, Israel
- Genres: Jazz
- Instruments: piano

Roy Assaf (Hebrew: רועי אסף; born 1982) is a New York-based Israeli jazz pianist and composer.

== Career ==
Born in Beersheba, he studied at Tel Aviv Conservatory, Berklee College of Music and Manhattan School of Music, from which he received an MA in May 2008. In 2008, he was one of 21 individuals to receive an American Society of Composers, Authors and Publishers (ASCAP) Young Jazz Composer award for the age group 18–29. Assaf has also won the 31st Down Beat Student Award for Outstanding Performance, 2nd place in the Charlie Palmieri Memorial Piano Competition, Eubie Blake National Jazz Institute Award, America Israel Cultural Foundation Prize for Young Israeli Musicians and the 30th Down Beat Student Award for Best Jazz Arrangement.
