= Robert H. Ossoff =

American physician-scientist and otolaryngologist

- Born: Robert Henry Ossoff
- Education: Bowdoin College; Tufts University; Northwestern University
- Scientific career
- Fields: Otolaryngology
- Workplaces: Feinberg School of Medicine; Vanderbilt University Medical Center

Robert Henry Ossoff is an American physician-scientist and otolaryngologist. He is a professor emeritus at Vanderbilt University Medical Center where he previously held the Guy M. Maness Professorship of Laryngology and Voice.

== Education ==
Ossoff completed a B.A. at Bowdoin College in 1969. He earned a Doctor of Dental Medicine (1973) and Doctor of Medicine (1975) at Tufts University. He completed an internship at Northwestern Memorial Hospital. Ossoff was a resident in otorhinolaryngology and oral and maxillofacial surgery at the Feinberg School of Medicine. He was a research fellow in otolaryngology and maxillofacial surgery at the and clinical fellow in head and neck surgery at the National Institutes of Health. In 1981, Ossoff completed a M.S. in otolaryngology at Northwestern University.

== Career ==
Ossoff was a junior faculty clinical fellow at the American Cancer Society Northwestern Medical School through 1984. He became a faculty member in 1986.

Ossoff joined the Vanderbilt University Medical Center faculty in July 1986. He worked in various positions at Vanderbilt. Ossoff was the first director of the Vanderbilt Bill Wilkerson Center for Otolaryngology and Communication Sciences. He was "associate vice chancellor for Health Affairs, chief of staff for Vanderbilt University Adult Hospital, assistant vice chancellor of Compliance and Corporate Integrity and executive medical director for the Vanderbilt Voice Center." Through his career, Ossoff worked closely with James Duncavage, James Netterville, David Zealear, and Gaelyn Garrett.

Ossoff was the first Guy M. Maness Professor of Laryngology and Voice. He was chair of otolaryngology and founded the Vanderbilt Voice Center in 1991. He retired November 3, 2018.
