= Asaf =

Asaf is a name. People with the name include:

== Given name ==
- alternate spelling of Saint Asaph (died 601), Welsh Roman Catholic saint and bishop
- Asaf-ud-Daula, Nawab wazir of Awadh
- Asaf Abdrakhmanov (1918–2000), Soviet sailor during World War II; award the title Hero of the Soviet Union
- Asaf Ali (1888–1953), Indian independence fighter and lawyer
- Asaf Avidan (born 1980), Israeli singer-songwriter and musician
- Asaf Assi Dayan (born 1945), Israeli film director, actor, screenwriter and producer; son of Moshe Dayan
- Asaf Duraković (1940–2020), Croatian physician and expert in nuclear medicine and depleted uranium
- Asaf Hanuka (born 1974), Israeli illustrator and comic book artist
- Asaf Humayun (born 1951), retired vice admiral of the Pakistan Navy
- Asaf Khan (disambiguation), several Mughal noblemen
- Asaf Lifshitz (1942–2025), Israeli sculptor
- Asaf Messerer (1903–1992), Russian Jewish ballet dancer and teacher
- Asaf Shariv (born 1972), Israel's Consul General in New York
- Asaf Yasur (born 2002), Israeli Paralympic champion and world champion taekwondo athlete
- Asaf Zeynally (1909–1932), Azerbaijani composer
- Asaf Simhoni (1922–1956), Israeli Major General

== Surname ==
- George Asaf, pseudonym of George Henry Powell (1880–1951), Welsh songwriter best known for writing "Pack Up Your Troubles in Your Old Kit-Bag"

== See also ==
- Asif, a given name
- Assaf (disambiguation)
- Asafu
- Asaf Jahi dynasty
