= Asifa Zamani =

Indian scholar of Persian language

- Occupations: Professor, writer
- Writing career
- Notable awards: Padma Shri Award (2004) Bharat Gaurav award (1999)

Asifa Zamani (22 March 1945 – 13 June 2025) was an Indian scholar of Persian language. She was awarded Padma Shri in 2004 by Government of India for her outstanding work.
