= Asif Bashir Bhagat =

Pakistani politician

Asif Bashir Bhagat آصف بشیر بھاگٹ

Member of the Provincial Assembly PPP
- In office 2008–2013
- Preceded by: Shehbaz Sharif
- Succeeded by: Shehbaz Sharif

Personal details
- Born: Phalia, Punjab, (Pakistan)
- Party: PPP (2008-now)
- Children: 2 sons 1 daughter
- Education: B.A.
- Profession: Politician & lawyer

Asif Bashir Bhagat (Urdu: آصف بشیر بھاگٹ) was born in Bhagat village, Tehsil Phalia, in Mandi Bahauddin, Punjab, Pakistan. He was elected as Member Provincial Assembly of the Punjab in the 2008 general elections against PML-N candidate Pir Syed Tariq Yaqoob Rizvi and PML-Q's candidate Basma Riaz Choudhry from the Constituency PP-117 (Mandi Bahuddin-II) and served as chairman Standing Committee on Sports.
