= Rimma Aldonina =

Russian architect and poet

Rimma Petrovna Aldonina
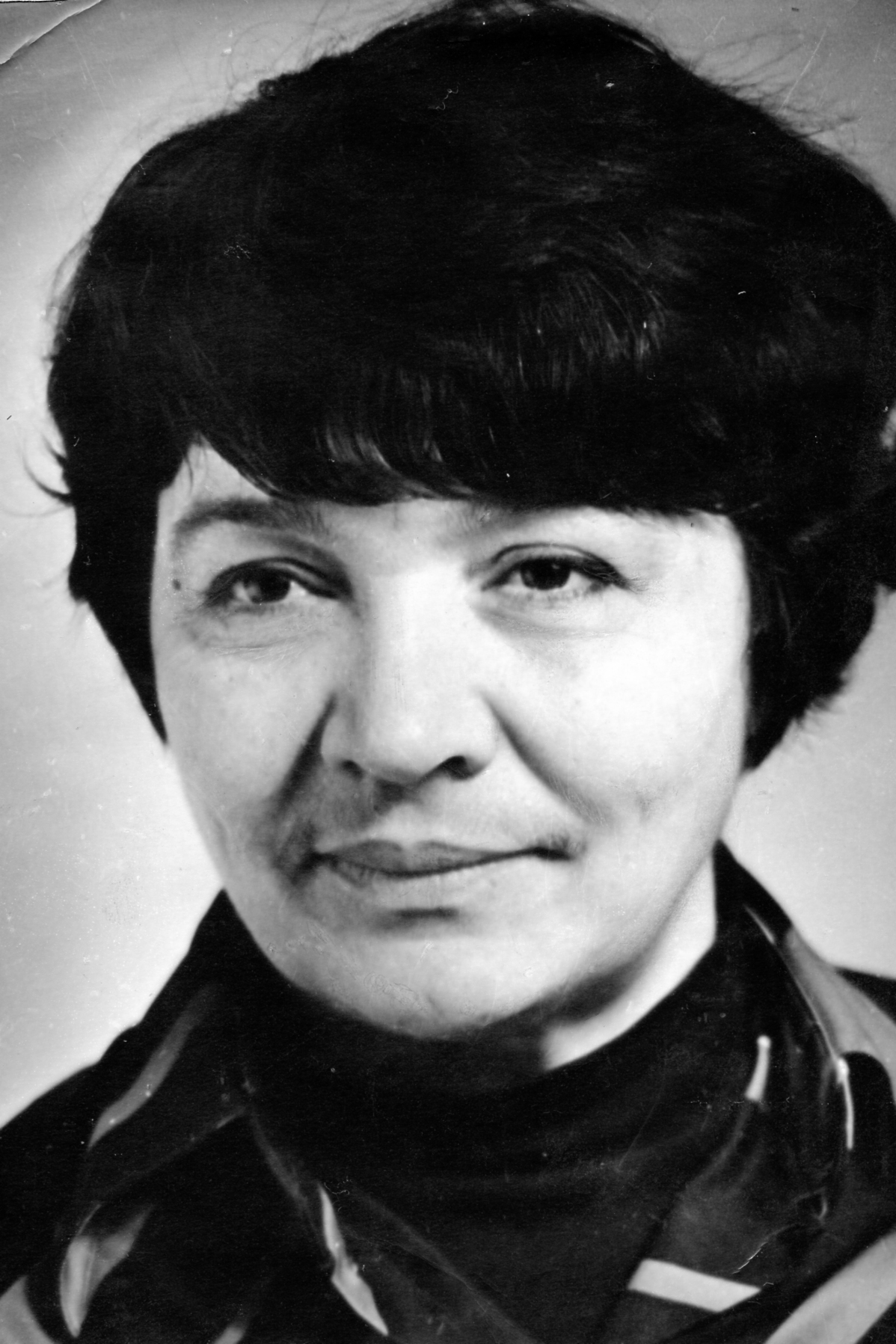
- Portrait of Rimma Aldonina, 1972
- Born: March 7, 1928 (age 98); Moscow, USSR
- Education: Moscow Architectural Institute
- Occupation: Architect
- Spouse: Grigory Grigoryevich Lysenko
- Children: Olga Grigoryevna Sazonova
- Awards: Order of the Badge of Honour
- Buildings: Elbrus Movie theater, ZiL House of Culture (reconstruction)
- Projects: Nagatinskaya embankment

Rimma Petrovna Aldonina (Римма Петровна Алдонина; born March 7, 1928, in Moscow) is a Russian architect and children's poet.

== Biography ==
Aldonina was born in Moscow to a working family. Her father was Pyotr Fadeyevich Aldonin (1894–1944), who worked as an accountant before World War II. In 1941, he became the Reserve Officer and was mobilized into the working army, dying in December 1944 in Odessa. Her mother was Mariya Ivanovna Aldonina (1902–1994), a nurse.

== Career ==
Aldonina is an Honorable architect of the Russian Federation, a Member of the Soviet Architects Organization and a Member of the Soviet Writers Organization. She has mostly known for her design of the Elbrus Movie theater (1969) and the reconstruction project of the ZiL House of Culture (1966–1976). She is a participant, soloist, and member of the Collective of Satire Writers ensemble Moscow architects "Kohinor and Reishinka," head of "Reishinski." For her activeness in this, she received a medal and the Irina Arkhipova Foundation prize.

She is one of the writers for the Central Theater of Dolls "Govorit i Pokazivaet GCTK" and "Novosele".

== Literature ==
- Sokolina, Anna, ed. (2021). The Routledge Companion to Women in Architecture. Routledge. ISBN 9780367232344.
