= Rima Iraki =

Norwegian television presenter

Rima Iraki (born 1982) is a Norwegian television presenter and news anchor.

She was born to a Palestinian father and Lebanese mother in East Berlin in East Germany. The family moved to Dubai when she was 3 years old and migrated to Norway when she was 5. Here, she grew up in Lørenskog. She studied in Brisbane, Australia and took a degree in journalism and international studies.

After a period as an anchor for the local news NRK Østlandssendingen, Iraki joined the cast of news anchors on Norway's largest news broadcast Dagsrevyen in 2014. Eventually she also presented the foreign affairs program, Urix. Since 2020, she was also a co-presenter of Festen etter fasten, an Eid al-Fitr show at NRK.

== Personal life ==
She married a Moroccan-Norwegian whom she met in Australia. They had two daughters.
