= Assaf Kidron =

Israeli sculptor

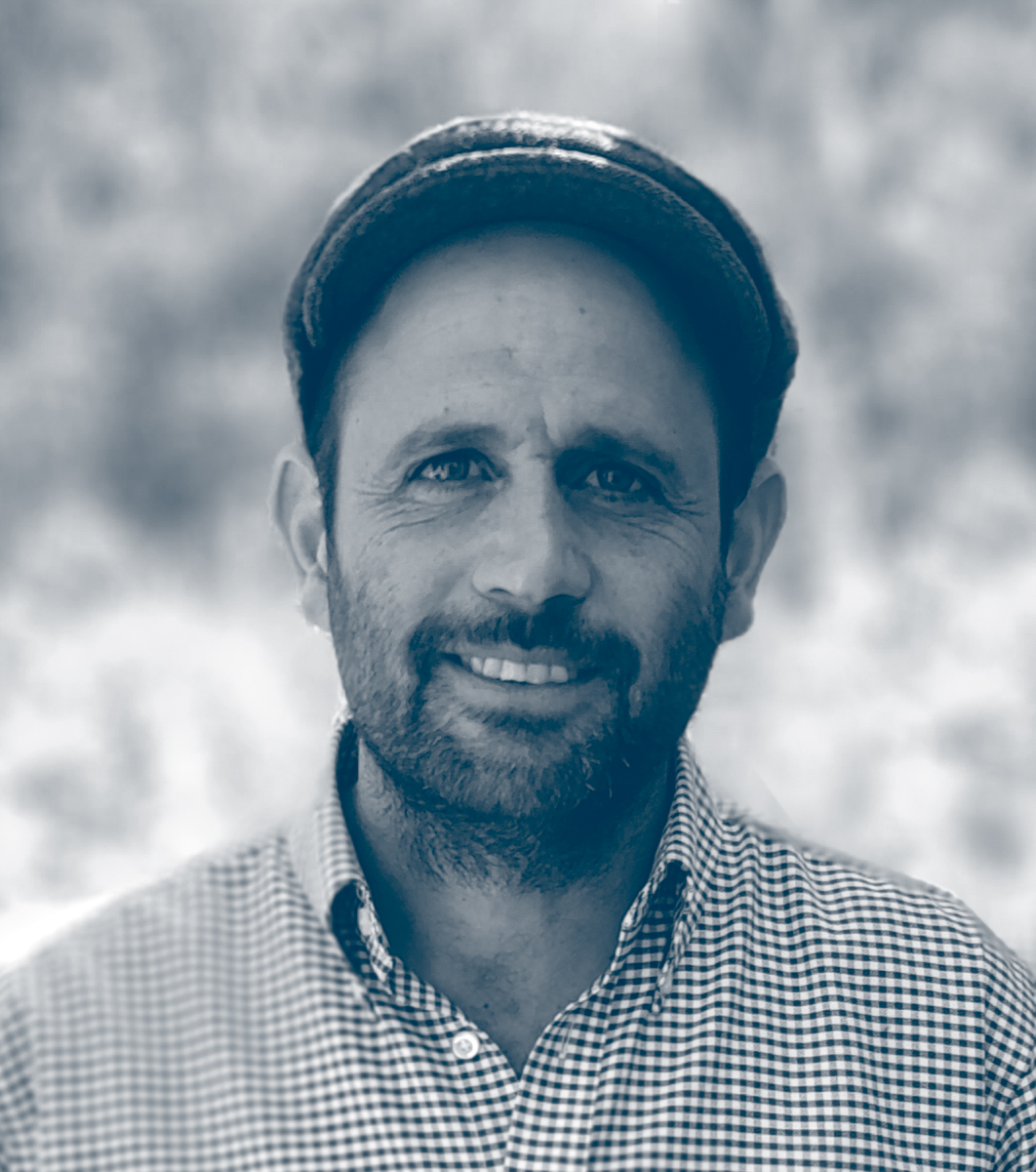
Assaf Kidron, 2024

Assaf Kidron (Hebrew: אסף קדרון; born February 12, 1976) is an Israeli sculptor who works mainly with stone. His creations enhance memorial and religious sites throughout Israel.

== Biography ==
Assaf Kidron was born to Yosef and Rachel Kidron in Safed. He attended the Ari Elementary School in Safed and the Boy's Town Yeshiva High School in Jerusalem. He also studied at Yeshivat Tiferet Tzvi and Yeshivat Kedumim. He completed his military service in the Netzah Yehuda Battalion. He is married to Nurit Fuchs Kidron.

== Selected works ==
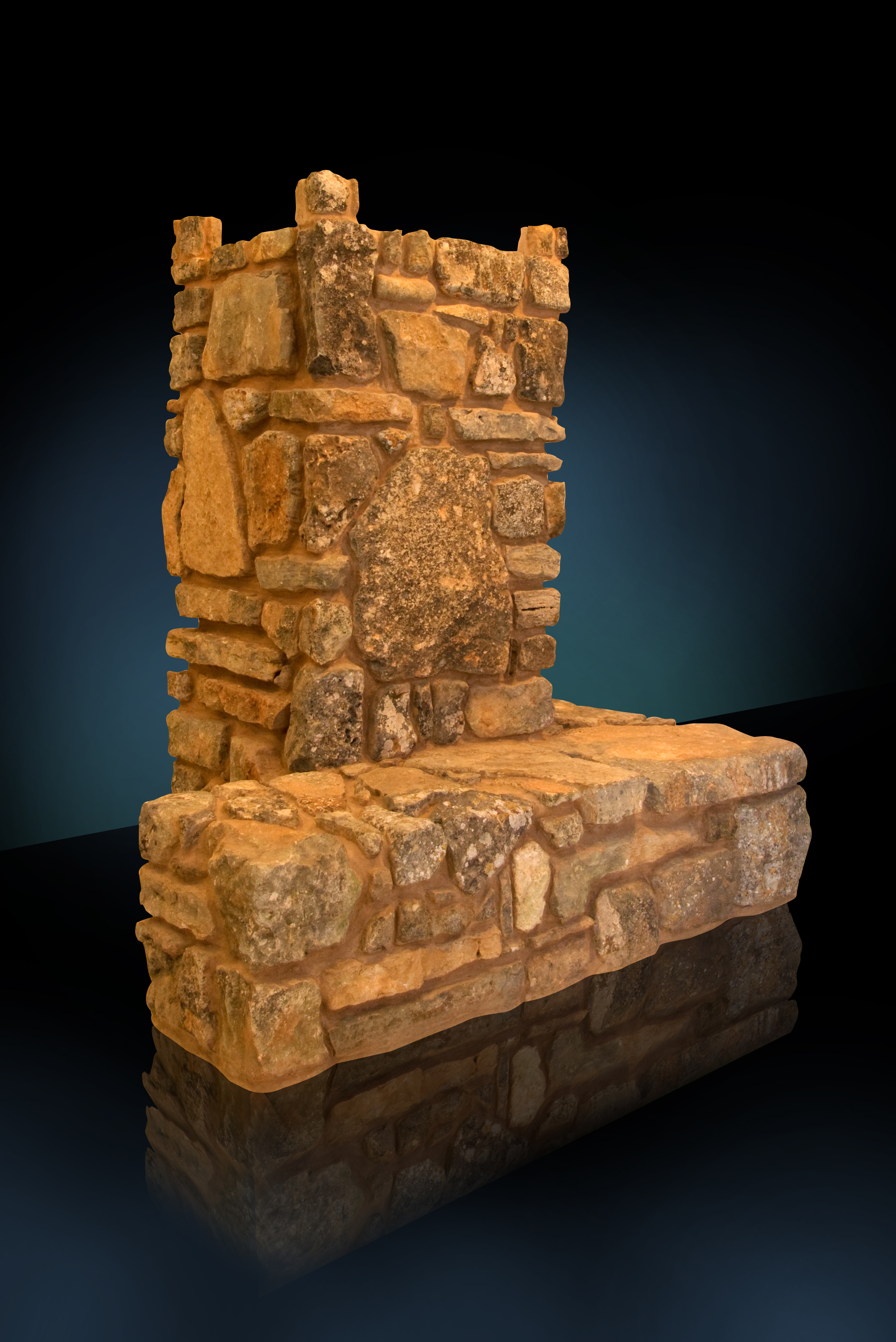
Model of the Sacrificial Altar from the Temple Institute Museum

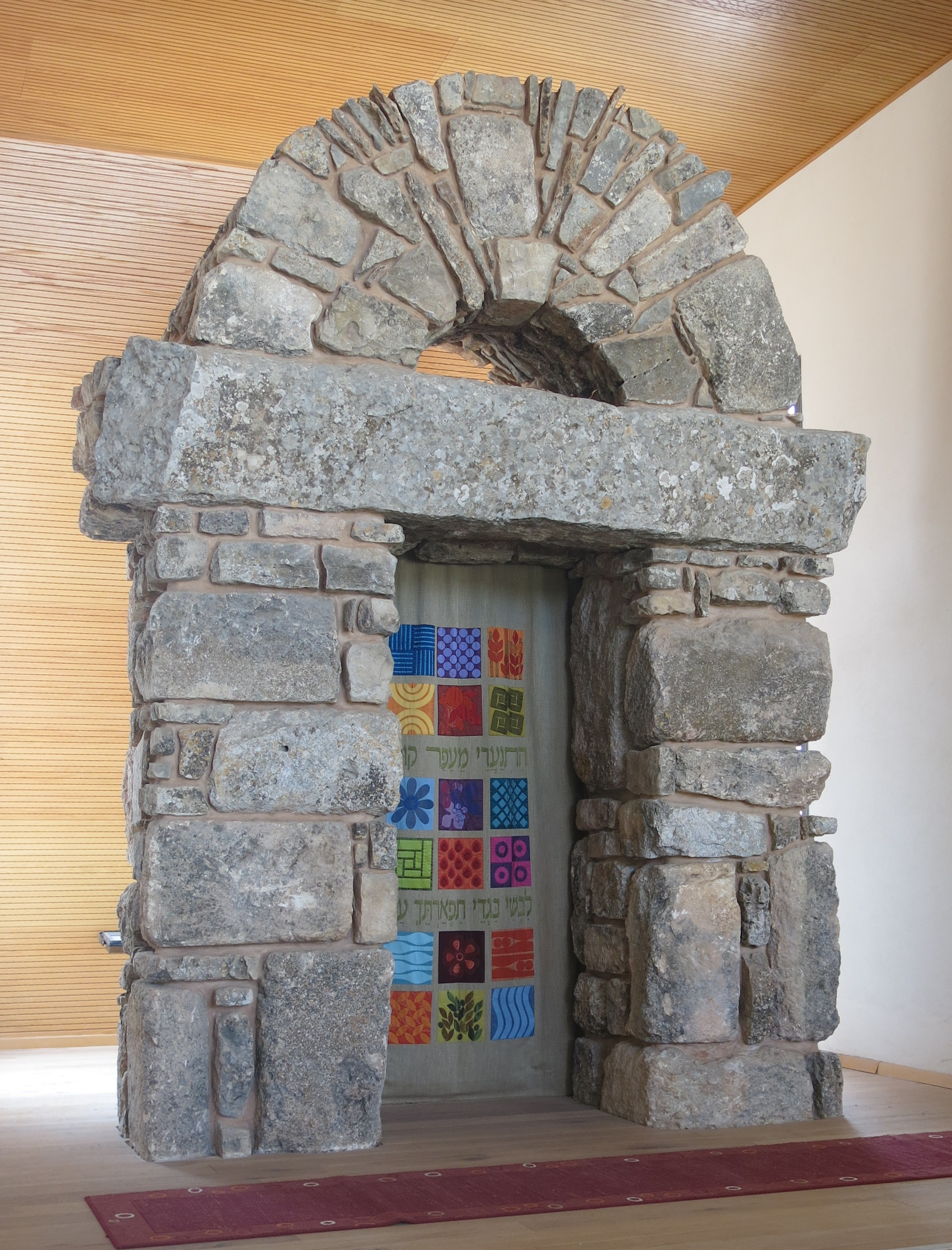
The Holy Ark in Yeshivat Itamar

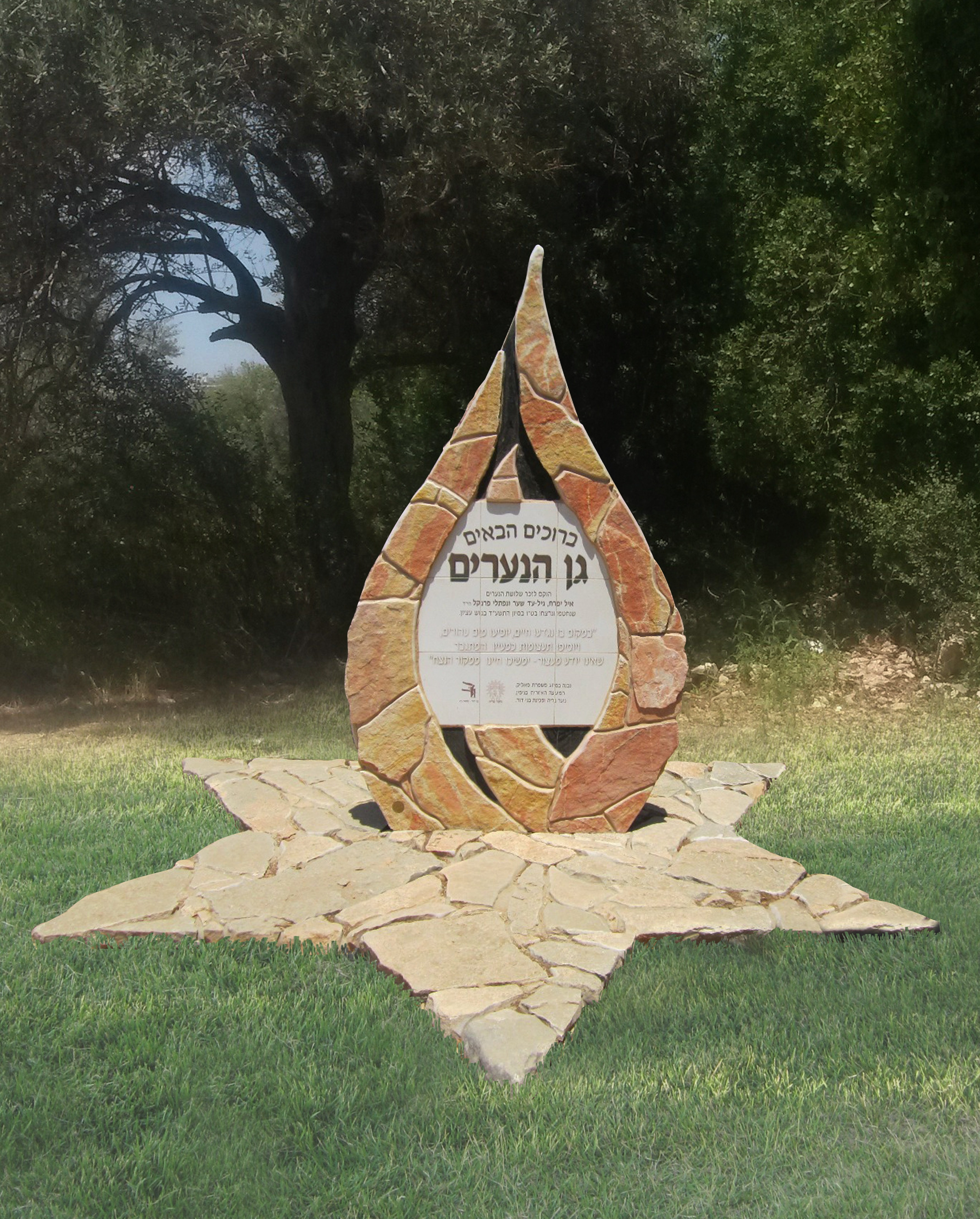
The Memorial Monument for the three martyred boys

In 2007, Kidron built a memorial to Joshua on the Giv'ot Olam Farm. At its center is a mosaic floor bearing the inscription: "Joshua son of Nun. Be strong and courageous." The oeuvre consists of seven circles around which are planted sixty olive trees symbolizing various aspects of the story about Joshua's battle of Jericho. At the Givot Olam Farm Kidron likewise created the synagogue's Holy Ark and prayer stand.

The model of the sacrificial altar that Kidron constructed in 2009 is on permanent exhibition at The Temple Institute Museum. The stones were collected from the area of the altar on Mount Ebal, where Joshua built an altar when he was entering the Land. In 2010, Kidron constructed the grave marker of Rabbi Mordechai Eliyahu. That grave marker is made of stones brought from the Four Holy Cities.

In 2011, in the Itamar attack, members of the Vogel Family were murdered at Itamar. A year after the murder was the dedication of Mishkan Ehud [Ehud's Tabernacle], the permanent edifice of the post-high-school yeshiva in Itamar. The yeshiva's Holy Ark and bima [synagogue platform for Torah readings] were constructed by Assaf Kidron. The Ark was fashioned from local stone. The earth between the stones was taken from the garden of the Vogel family.

In 2014, three teenagers were kidnapped and murdered in Gush Etzion. About a year later, Kidron built a monument in their memory at Einot Aner [Aner's Springs] in the Talmonim Settlement Block in Western Samaria, where one of the three murdered boys, Gilad Sha'er, lived.

In 2016, two mezuzot created by Kidron were affixed in the Cave of the Patriarchs in Hebron, in the Abraham and Jacob Halls.

In 2018 a Chanukah Menorah fashioned by Kidron was awarded to American Vice President Mike Pence at the Western Wall, at the conclusion of his visit to the Holy Land. The Menorah was crafted from a stone taken from the valley beneath the town of Ma'ale Levona. There, Judah Maccabee and his handful of fighters fought their first heroic battle against the legions of the Greek Empire.

Following America's declaring that they would move their embassy to Jerusalem and recognize Jerusalem as capital of the State of Israel, Kidron was asked to prepare a meaningful work of art that would express the State of Israel's gratitude to the American Government. On March 5, 2018, Israeli Prime Minister Benjamin Netanyahu awarded the art work to U.S. President Donald Trump.

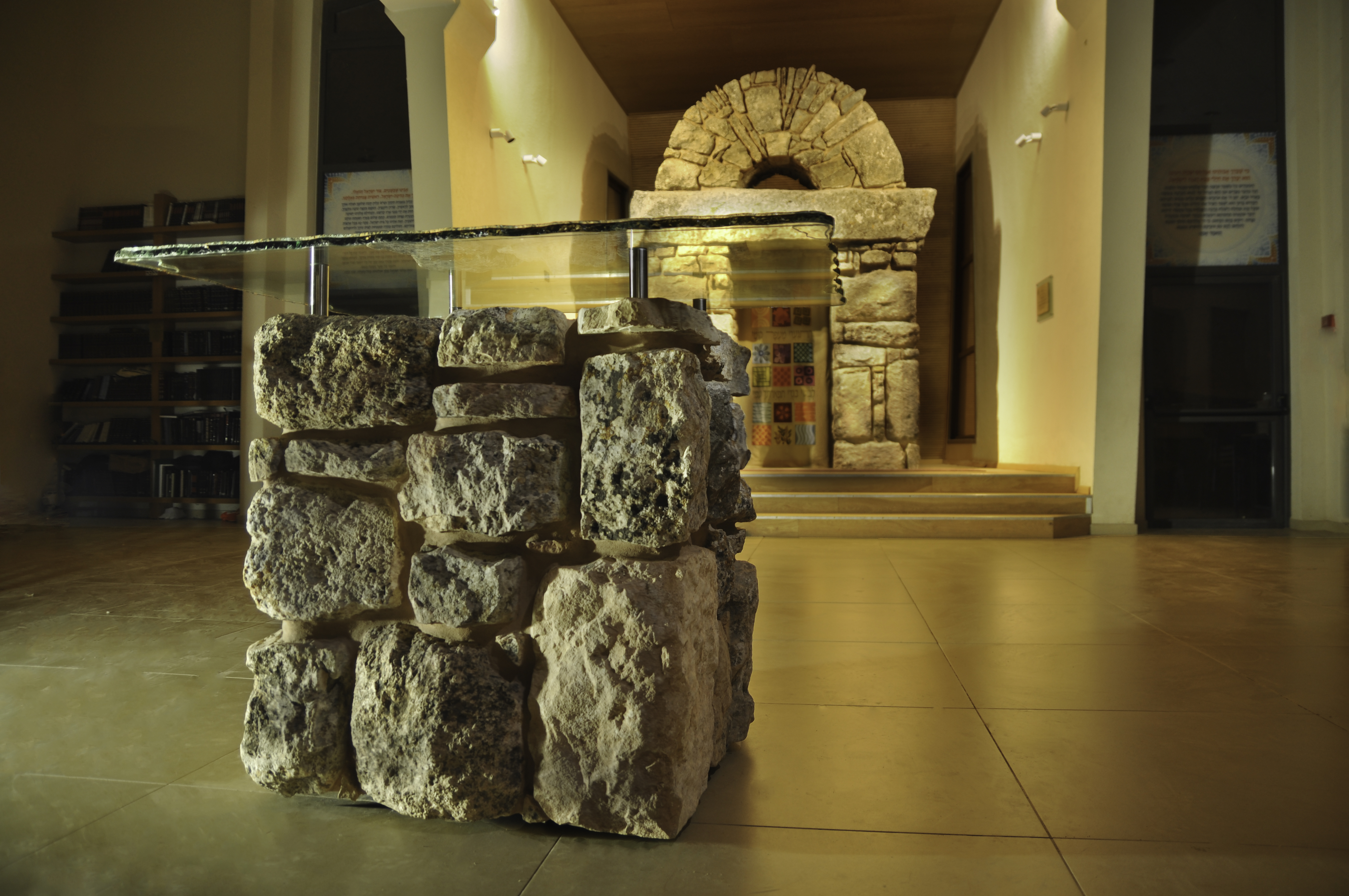
The Bima in the study hall of Yeshivat Itamar

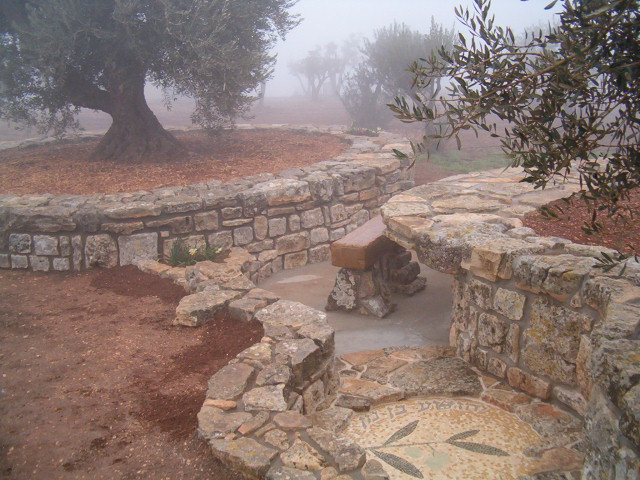
Section of the memorial to Joshua son of Nun

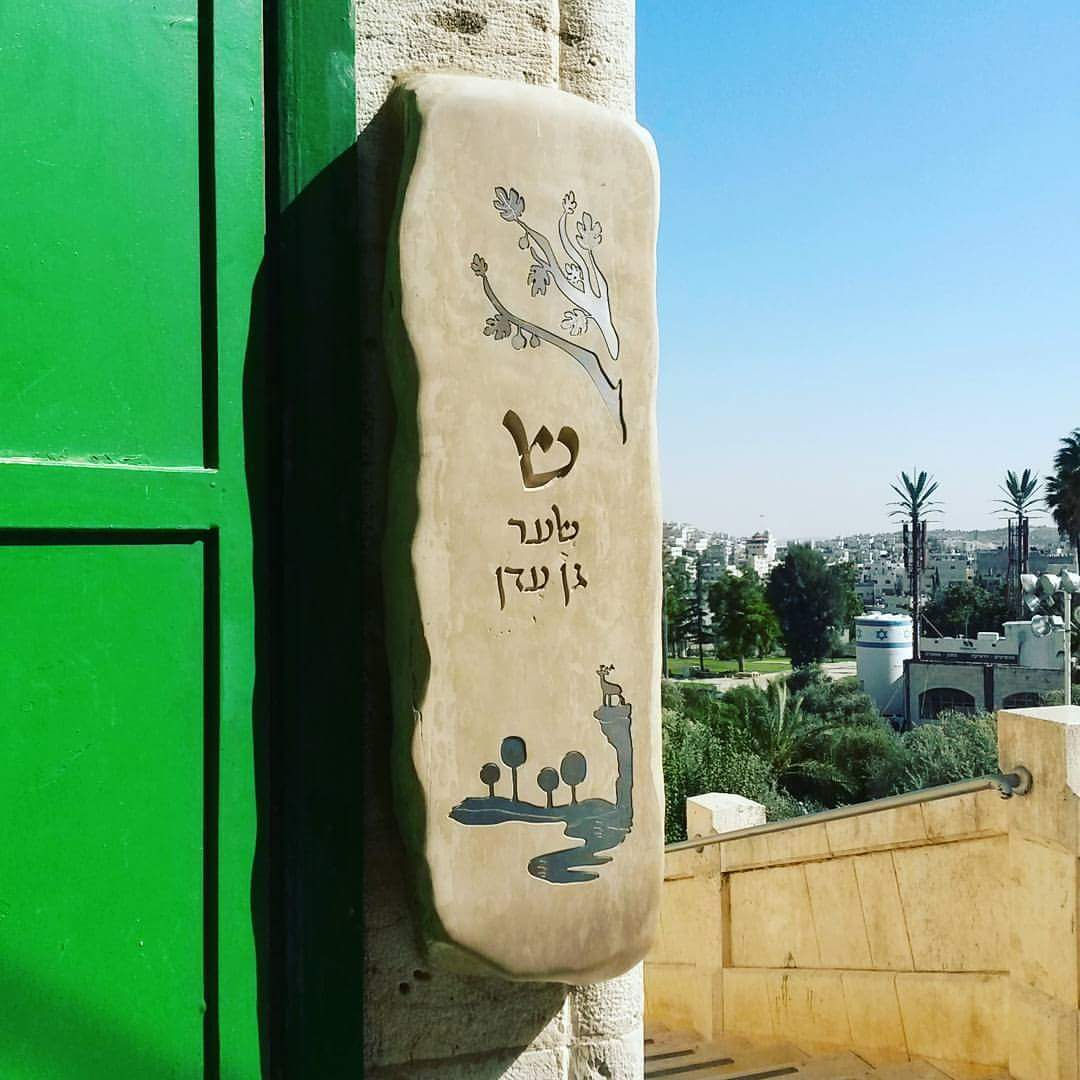
Mezuza at the Main Entrance to the Tomb of the Patriarchs, Hebron.

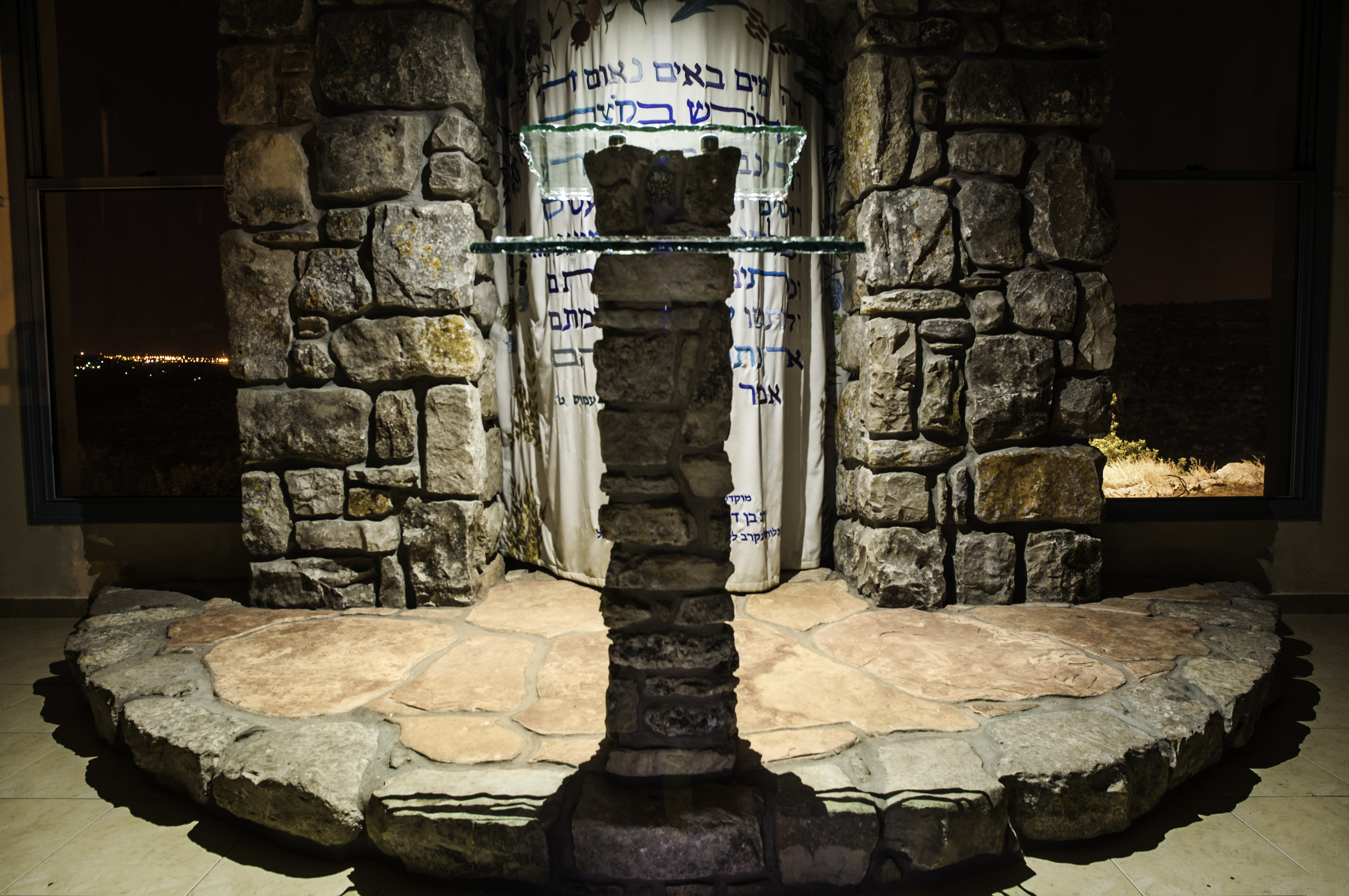
Prayer Lectern from Stone and Glass

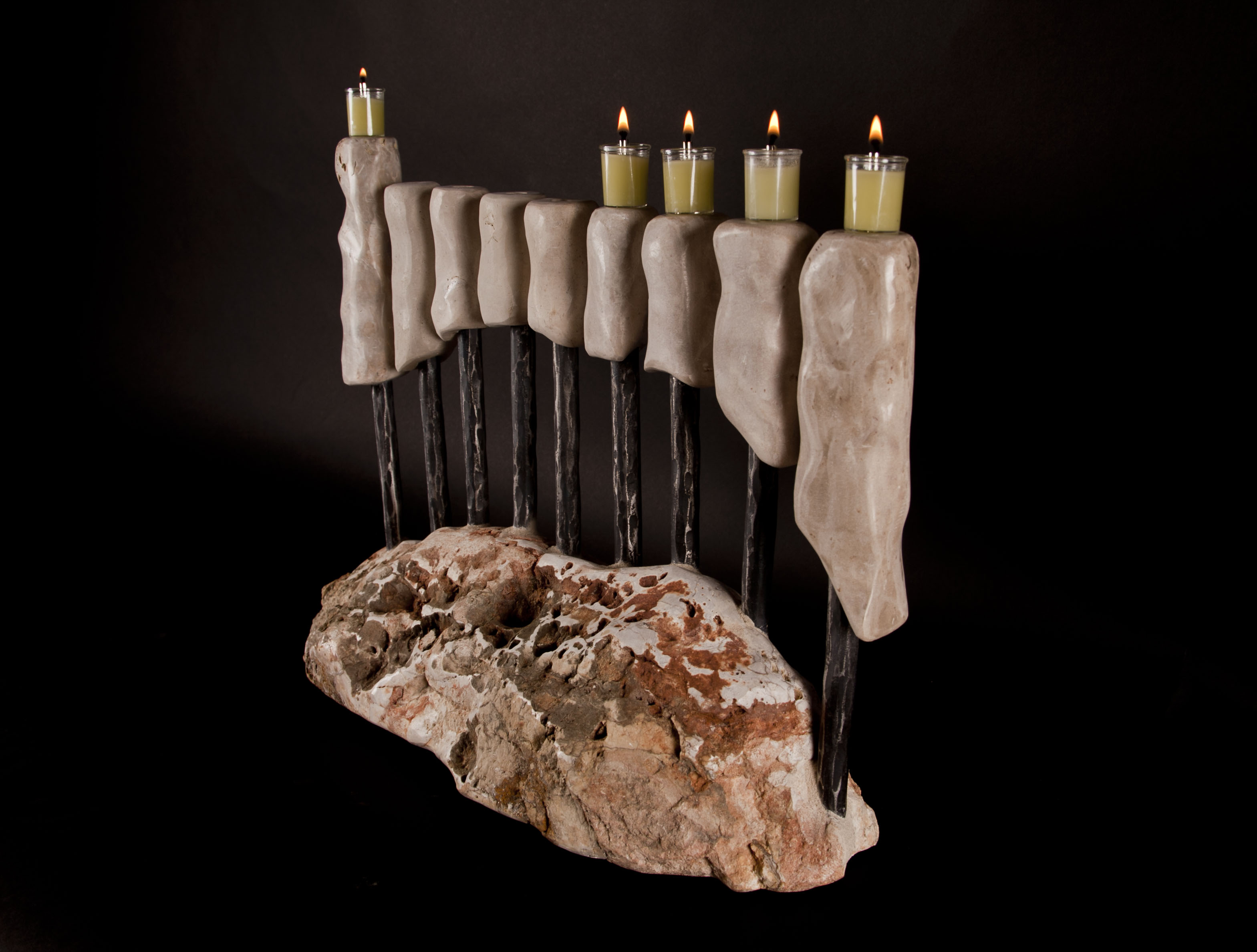
Menora Made of Stone and Iron

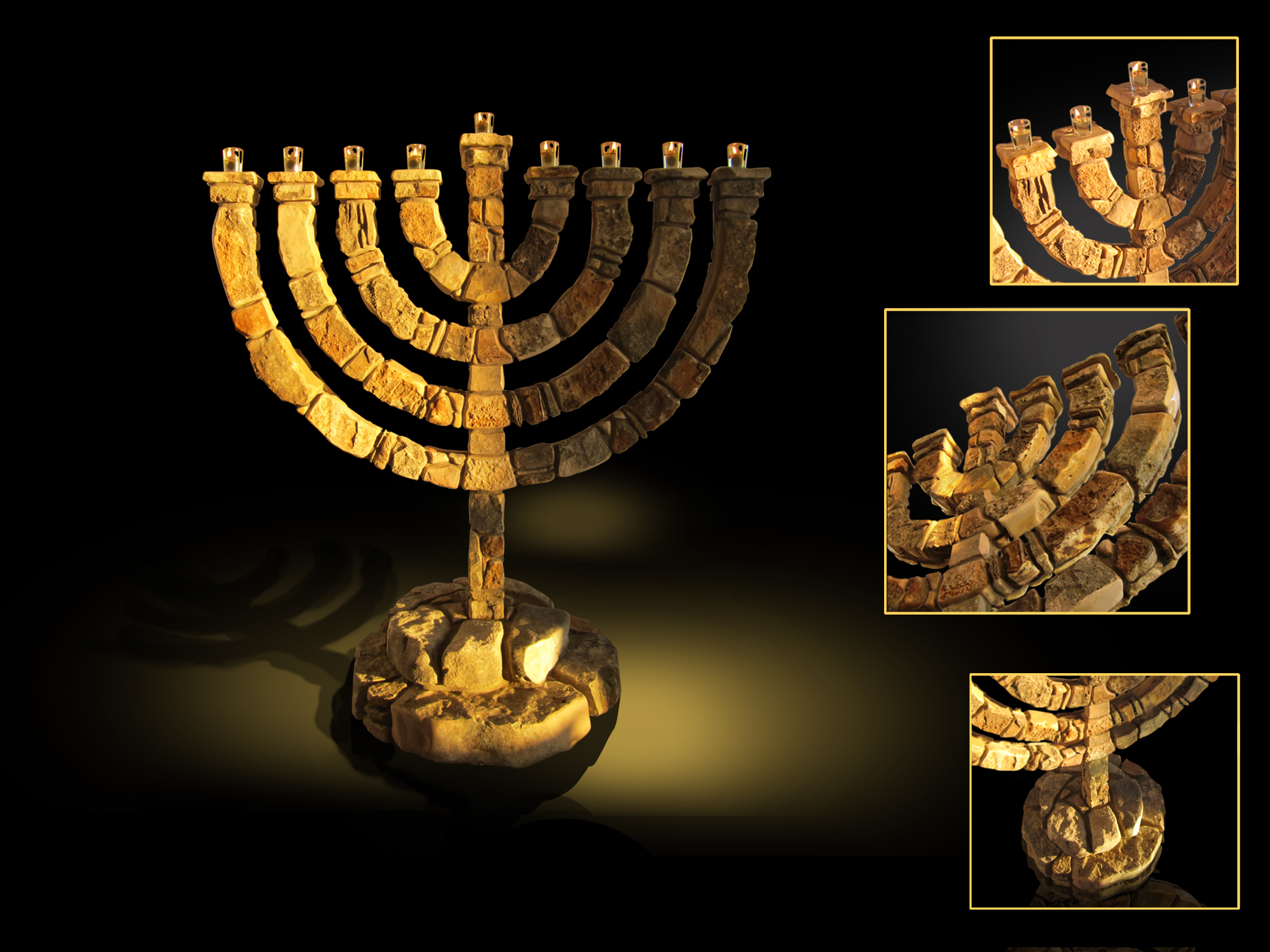
