= Rima Assaf =

Lebanese journalist and anchor

- Born: March 10, 1970 (age 56); Hardine, Lebanon
- Occupation: News anchor
- Years active: 1991–present
- Spouse: Georges Tannous

Rima Assaf (Arabic: ريما عساف; born March 10, 1970) is a Lebanese journalist and anchor.

== Early life ==
Rima Assaf was born in Hardine, North Lebanon and raised in Chekka, North Lebanon. Her mother is a housewife and her father, now deceased, used to work in commerce. She has one brother, Antoine, and one sister, Ramza.

Assaf attended Saint Famille High School, Chekka and graduated in 1992 with a diploma in Journalism from the Lebanese University. She landed her first training job in 1991 as a news anchor at Radio Free Lebanon.

== Personal life ==
Rima Assaf is married to cardiologist Georges Tannous. They have two children a daughter, Rosa Maria and a son, Elia.

== Career ==
Rima Assaf began her career in media during her university years as a trainee at RLL. Upon her graduation, the radio administration decided to give her a job as a bulletin editor. In 1994, Rima worked as a news anchor and bulletin editor at CVN television station for two years. Later, she joined the production team of Kalam El Nass – a social political show airing on LBC – and participated in many talk shows about political events. On November 24, 2020, Rima announced officially on her Twitter and Facebook account that she is leaving LBC after 24 years. She continues her career on Al hurra TV.

== Awards ==
Rima Assaf received a special commendation from the BBC training team during the training sessions that included many news anchors from different Lebanese television stations including LBC.
