= Jean-Louis Anselin =

French engraver (1754 – 1823)

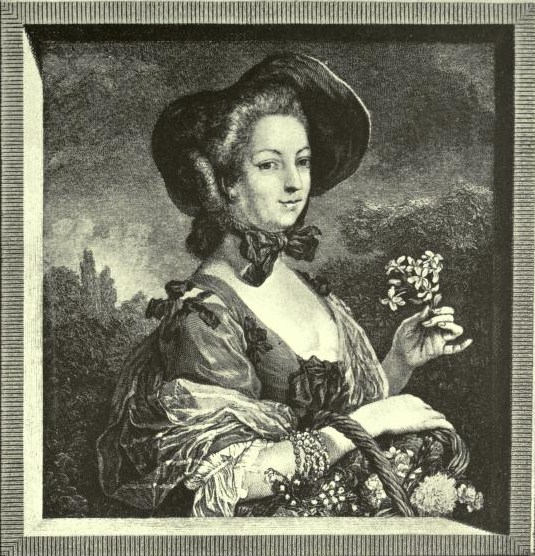
Madame Pompadour as "La Belle Jardiniere" (after Charles-André van Loo)

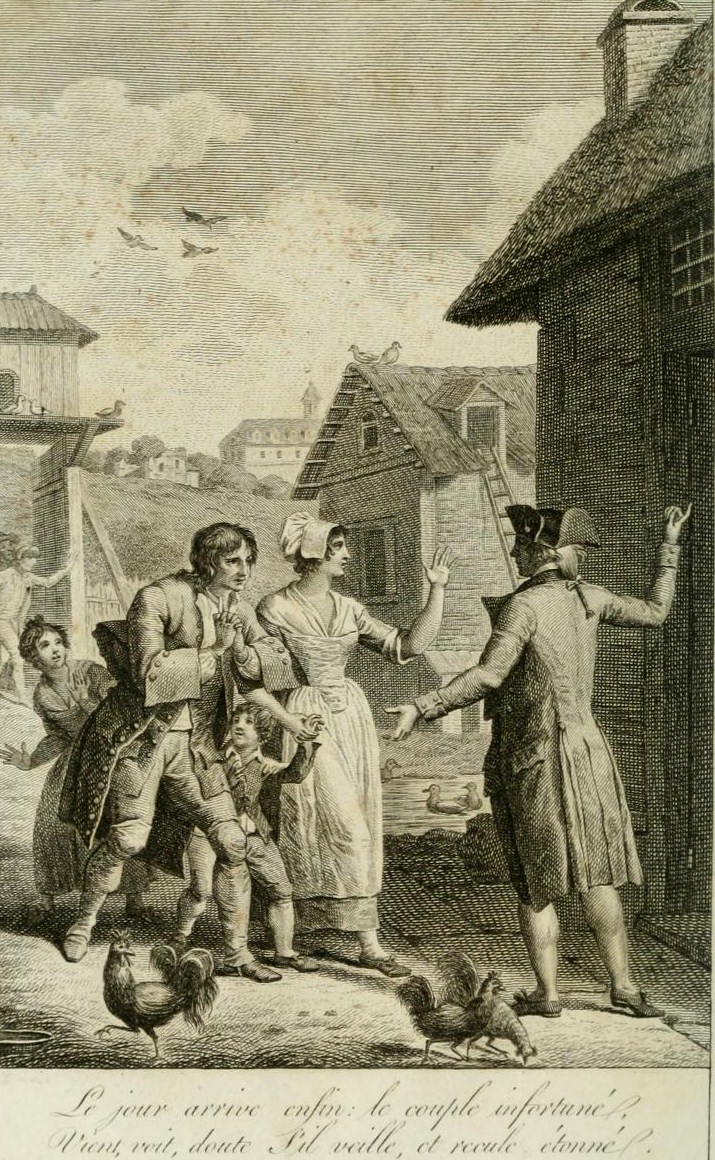
Frontispiece from "La Pitié" (engraving after Monsiau)

Jean-Louis Anselin (26 May 1754 – 15 March 1823) was a French engraver. Amongst his best work is an engraved portrait of Madame de Pompadour as "La Belle Jardinière" (pictured).

== Life and work ==
Anselin was born in Paris. His name was originally "Enslyn", and his grandfather, who came to France after the reign of James II of England, was of Scottish origin. Jean-Louis studied engraving under Augustin de Saint-Aubin and became one of his best pupils. He started off by engraving subjects then in fashion, finding a ready market both in France and abroad at the end of the reign of Louis XV and his successor. "Le Satyre impatient" (after Jacques-Philippe Caresme) was engraved under the direction of his teacher, Saint-Aubin.

Amongst his early, independent, works were two erotic compositions after Antoine Borel - "Vous avez la clef, mais il a trouvé la serrure" and "La faute est faite, permettez quil la répare" - and "The pleasures of Anacréon", after Jean-Bernard Restout.

Not long after the death of King Louis XV's chief mistress, Madame Pompadour, he engraved a portrait of her as a shepherdess after Charles-André van Loo. He also engraved portraits of Cardinal de Bouillon; Nicolas Boileau-Despréaux; Jean-Baptiste Rousseau (the last for an edition of his works published in 1795), plus a smaller portrait of Rousseau; a small profile of Cicero after Moreau; and both drew and engraved a portrait of Hue de Miroménil (keeper of the seal and deputy to the Chancellor of France (Minister of Justice) from 1774 to 1787).

Amongst other large works, he engraved "The Siege of Calais", after Jean-Simon Berthélemy. He dedicated the engraving to the National Assembly, who accepted the honour officially in a session of 16 September 1789. The citizens of Calais also showed their appreciation by making him a "Burgher of Calais" on 21 January 1790. He also engraved, after Nicolas-André Monsiau, "Molière lisant son Tartuffe chez Ninon de Lenclos.

Anselin engraved the frontispiece, after Charles Monnet (1732–1808), for an edition of "The works of Bertin" (1791); a frontispiece after the sculptor Boizot, representing time surrounded by allegorical figures; four illustrations, after Monnet, for the "Works of Évariste Parny"; and the illustrations, after Monsiau, for "La Pitié", a poem by Jacques Delille (1803), which he completed with three other engravers working under his supervision (Courbe, Berthaud and Duparc).

Anselin was nominated, with Bervic, to the "education committee" for "La société populaire des arts" serving during one of the most violent times of the revolutionary era.

Jena-Louis Anselin died in Paris on 15 March 1823.
