= Dilawar, Punjab =

Dilawar
- Location within Pakistan
- Coordinates: 32.43°N 73.32°E
- Country: Pakistan
- Province: Punjab
- Elevation: 207 m (679 ft)
- Time zone: UTC+5 (PST)

Dilawar (Urdu: دلاور) is a village of Mandi Bahauddin District in the Punjab province of Pakistan. It is located at 32°43'0N 73°32'0E at an altitude of 207 metres (682 feet).

Based on coin finds at Dilawar, Alexander Cunningham speculated that Dilawar tell was part of the lost city of Bucephala built by Alexander the Great, and probably named after Alexander's horse Bucephalus.
