= Alexander the Great Taming Bucephalus =

1826 painting by Benjamin Robert Haydon

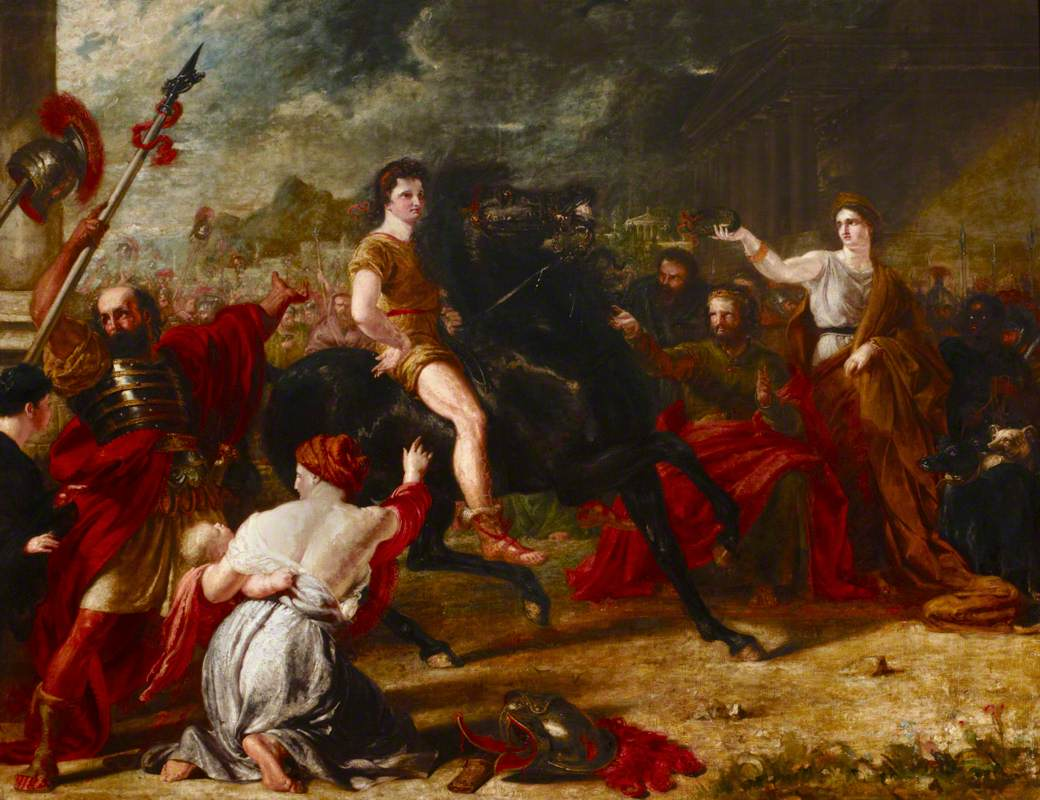
- Artist: Benjamin Robert Haydon
- Year: 1826
- Type: Oil on canvas, history painting
- Dimensions: 153 cm × 193 cm (60 in × 76 in)
- Location: Petworth House, Sussex

Alexander the Great Taming Bucephalus is an oil on canvas history painting by the British artist Benjamin Robert Haydon, from 1826.

== History and description ==
It depicts a scene from ancient history when Alexander the Great tamed his famous warhorse Bucephalus. On the right of the picture are Alexander's father Philip II of Macedon and mother Olympias.

It was purchased by the art collector George Wyndham, 3rd Earl of Egremont for his country estate Petworth House. Haydon received 500 guineas for the work. In order to depict Bucephalus, Haydon originally tried to draw inspiration from equestrian works by George Stubbs. When this was unsuccessful, Egremont arranged for him to have access to the Household Cavalry's riding school.

It was displayed at the Royal Academy's Summer Exhibition of 1827 at Somerset House. Critical reception was discouraging for Haydon with The Morning Post calling it "ill-grouped, ill-drawn, ill-coloured and extremely vulgar" although The Times praised its "good colouring and bold drawing". Today it is in the collection of the National Trust at Petworth House.

== See also ==
- Alexander Taming Bucephalus, a 1787 painting by Nicolas-André Monsiau

== Bibliography ==
- Brown, David Blamey, Woof, Robert & Hebron, Stephen. Benjamin Robert Haydon, 1786-1846: Painter and Writer, Friend of Wordsworth and Keats. Wordsworth Trust, 2009.
- O'Keeffe, Paul. A Genius for Failure: The life of Benjamin Robert Haydon. Random House, 2011.
