= Jean-Pierre Norblin de La Gourdaine =

French painter (1745–1830)

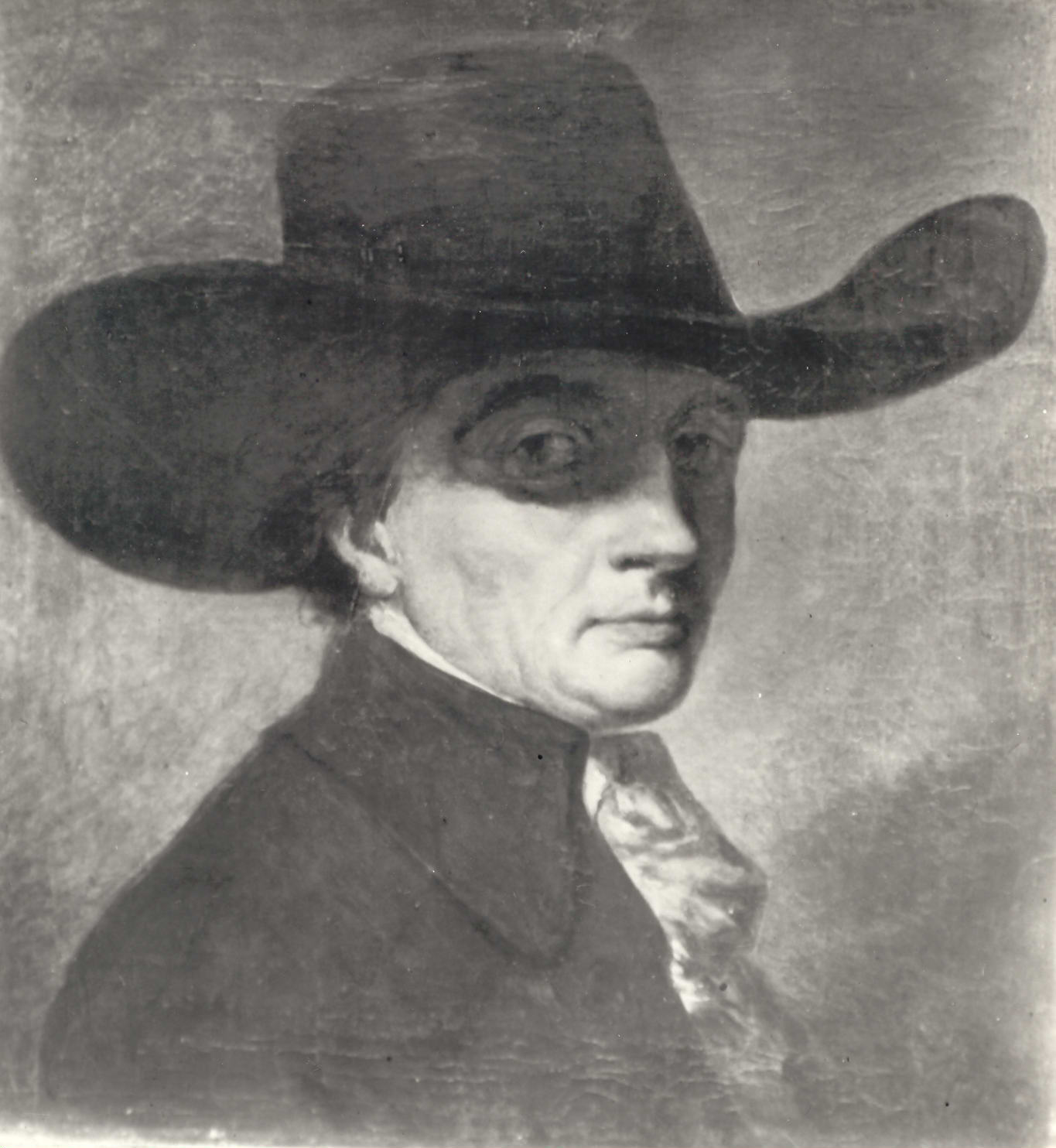
Self-portrait, 1780s

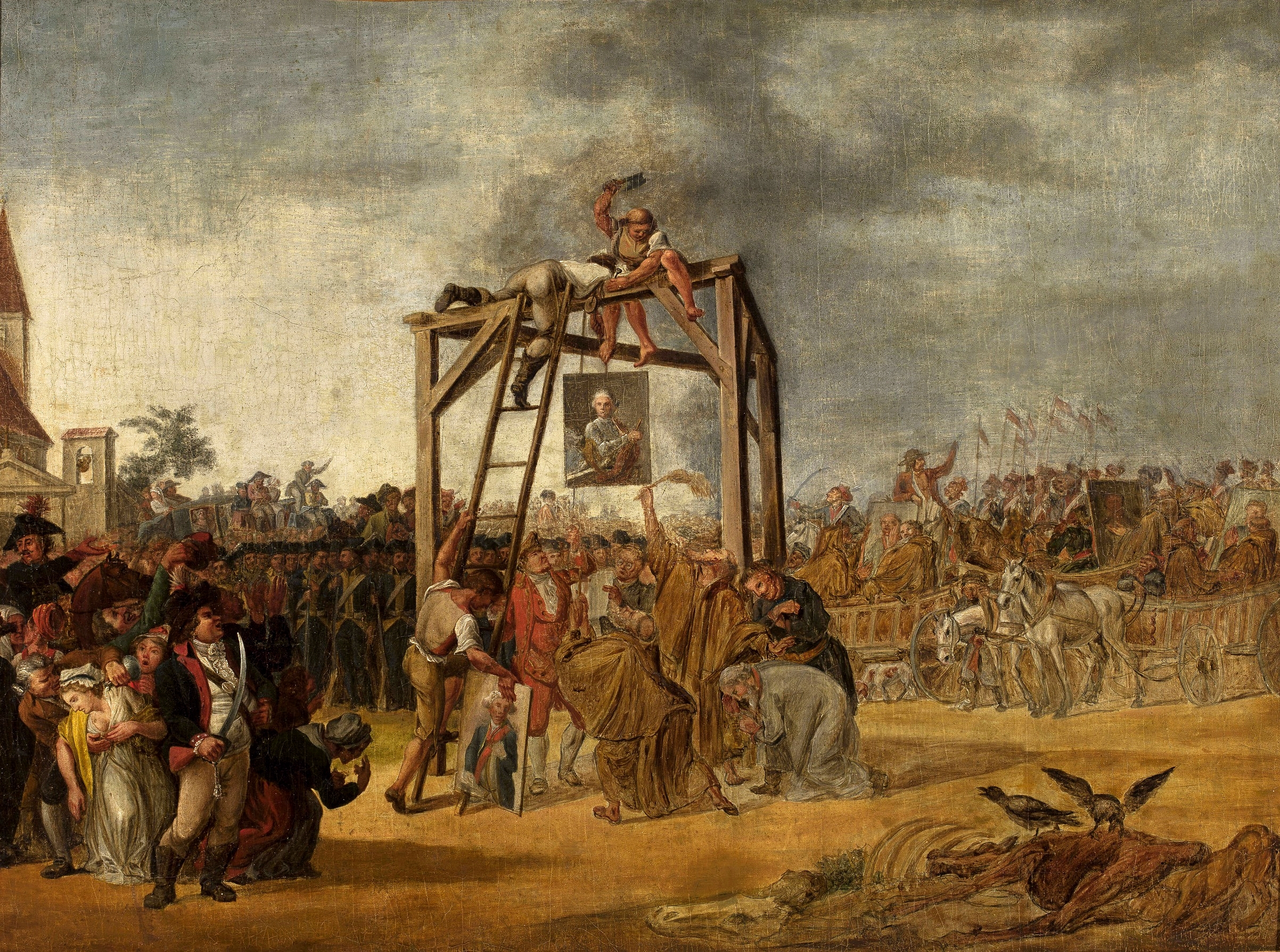
Hanging of traitors at Warsaw’s Old Town Market, a contemporary painting by Jan Piotr Norblin. The supporters of the Targowica Confederation, responsible for the second partition of Poland, became public enemies. If they could not be apprehended, their portraits were hanged instead.

Jean-Pierre Norblin de La Gourdaine (Polish: Jan Piotr Norblin; 15 July 1745 – 23 February 1830) was a French painter, draughtsman, engraver and caricaturist. Born in France, from 1774 to 1796 he resided in Poland.

He is considered one of the most important painters of the Enlightenment in Poland. He achieved great success in Poland. Given many commissions from some of the most notable families of the country, he stayed there for many years. His style showed the influence of Antoine Watteau, and combined the Rococo tradition of charming fêtes galantes and fêtes champêtres with a panorama of daily life and current political events, captured with journalistic accuracy. He created a gallery of portraits of representatives of all social classes in the last years of the Polish–Lithuanian Commonwealth.

== Life ==
Born in Misy-sur-Yonne in 1745, Norblin started his career in France, in the early 1760s (his first known works date to 1763). Later he became influenced by Rembrandt and Watteau. Around 1763 he trained in the studio of Parisian painter Jacques-Philippe Caresme and around 1765 he worked with Francesco Casanova. In 1765 he entered the Académie Royale de Peinture et de Sculpture, and in 1770–71 he studied under Louis-Michel van Loo at the Ecole Royale des Elèves Protégés, all in Paris. Around 1771–74 he worked in Paris, London, and Spa. Around 1772 or 1774 he met Polish Prince Adam Kazimierz Czartoryski, with whom he traveled for two years and by whom he was invited to Poland. From 1774 he worked for the magnate family of Czartoryski and became their court artist and tutor for the children. Among his early works the most prominent are his illustrations to Myszeida, a poem by Ignacy Krasicki. He worked in Puławy and at Powązki estates as painter and decorator of local Czartoryski's estates. Later he also worked for the Radziwiłł family in Arkadia (Nieborów) and for King Stanisław August Poniatowski.

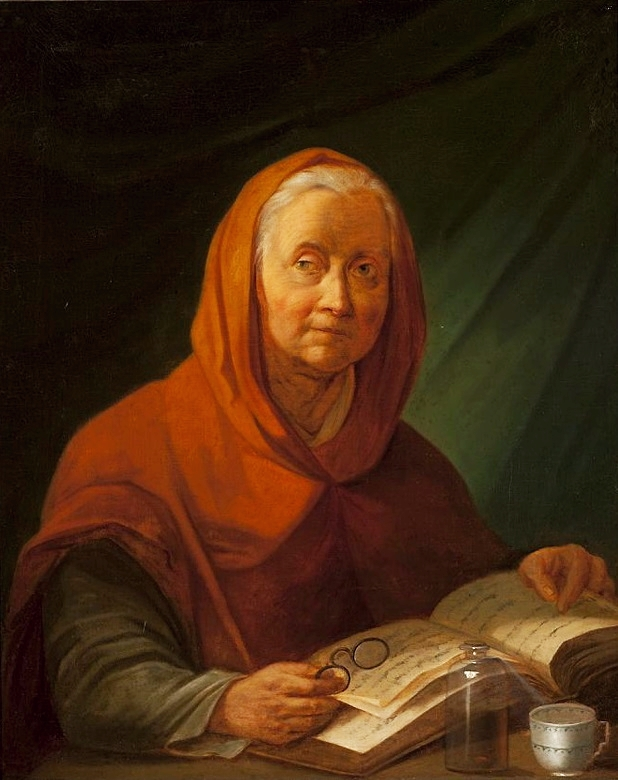
Old woman reading, National Museum in Warsaw

He settled in Warsaw and this move allowed him to witness and illustrate many important historical moments of the last years of the Polish-Lithuanian Commonwealth. His hurriedly sketched drawings illustrated the passing of the Constitution of the 3 May and soon he became famous as the eye-witness and painter-chronicler of the Kościuszko Uprising, immortalising many of the most famous events of that event in his paintings: from the Warsaw Uprising in April and the consequent hanging of Targowica traitors in the Old Market Square, through the battle of Racławice to Massacre of Praga. After his return to France in 1804 he still continued to paint based on some of his Poland-era drafts, but he also illustrated other contemporary events, among them the times of the Napoleon's wars. He died in Paris in 1830.

Norblin's students in Poland included Aleksander Orłowski, Michał Płoński and Jan Rustem. He assembled an interesting art collection, including works by François Boucher, Hubert Robert and Rembrandt.

Jean-Pierre Norblin de La Gourdaine was the great-grandfather of an equally accomplished artist, Stefan Norblin (full name: Juliusz Stefan Norblin de la Gourdaine; Warsaw, 29 June 1892 – 12 August 1952, San Francisco, California). The paintings of Stefan Norblin, who worked in Poland, India (during World War II) and the United States, were rediscovered in the 1990s in India, where they decorate maharajas' palaces, e.g., in Rajasthan. One of many postwar exhibitions of his works took place at the Regional Museum in Stalowa Wola, 3 September – 9 October 2011.

== See also ==
- List of Poles
- Marcello Bacciarelli
