= Bucephalus =

Horse of Alexander the Great

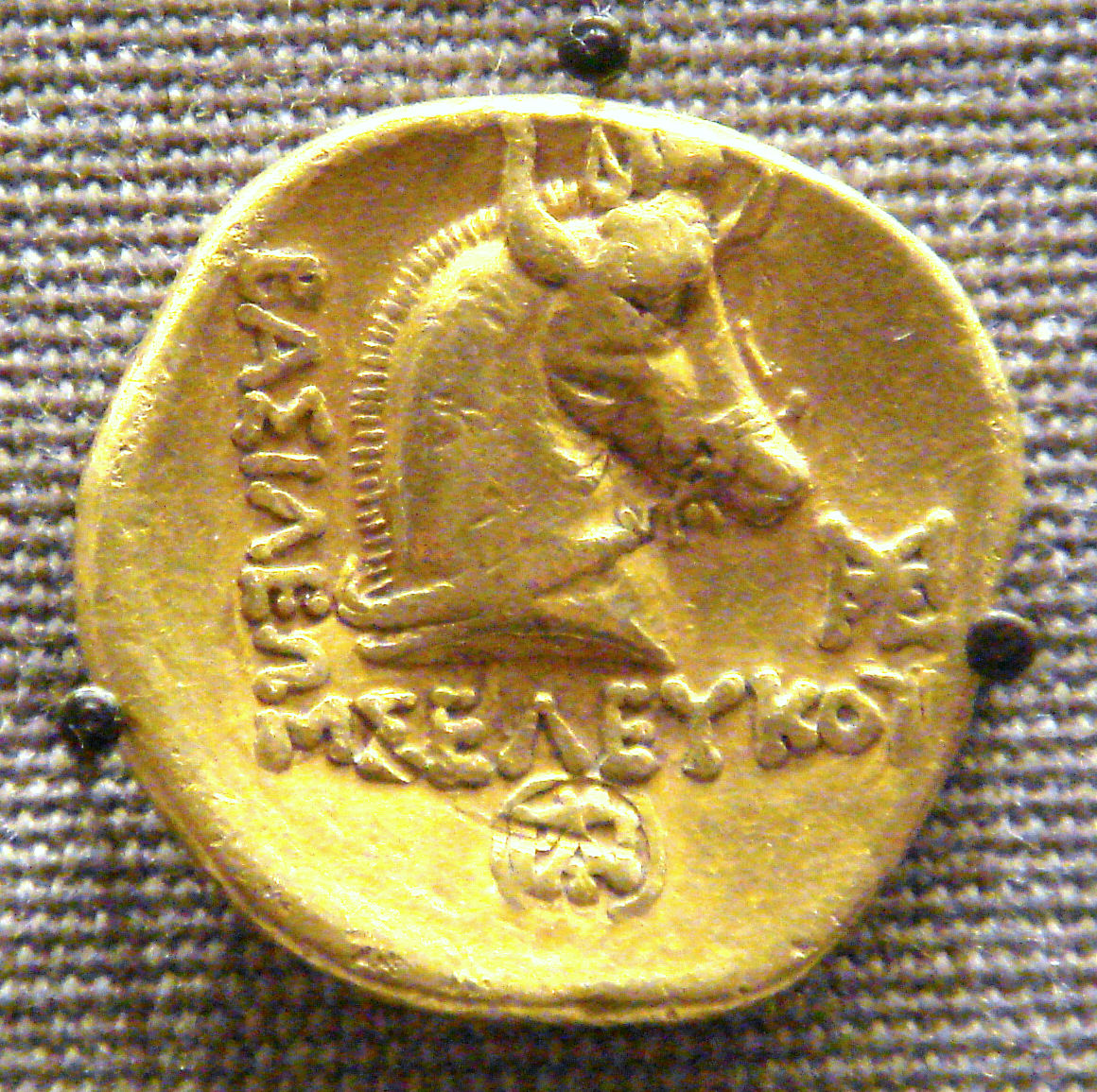
- Coin depicting Bucephalas, issued by Seleucus I Nicator. Note the horns on his head, from a literal interpretation of his name, which means "ox-head".
- Species: Horse
- Sex: Male
- Born: c. 355 BC
- Died: June 326 BC (aged 30); Indian Satrapy, Macedonian Empire (modern-day Pakistan)
- Resting place: Bucephala
- Occupation: Warhorse
- Years active: 344 BC – 326 BC
- Owner: Alexander the Great

Bucephalus (/bjuː.ˈsɛ.fə.ləs/; Ancient Greek: Βουκεφᾰ́λᾱς, romanized: Boukephalas; c. 355 BC – June 326 BC) or Bucephalas, was the horse of Alexander the Great, and one of the most famous horses of classical antiquity. According to the Alexander Romance (1.15), the name "Bucephalus" literally means "ox-headed" (from βοῦς, boûs, 'ox' and κεφᾰλή, kephălḗ, 'head'), and supposedly comes from a brand (or scar) on the thigh of the horse that looked like an ox's head.

Ancient historical accounts state that Bucephalus's breed was that of the "best Thessalian strain", and that he died in what is now Punjab, Pakistan, after the Battle of the Hydaspes in 326 BC. Alexander was so grieved at the loss of his horse that he named one of the many cities he founded after him, as Alexandria Bucephalus.

== Taming of Bucephalus ==
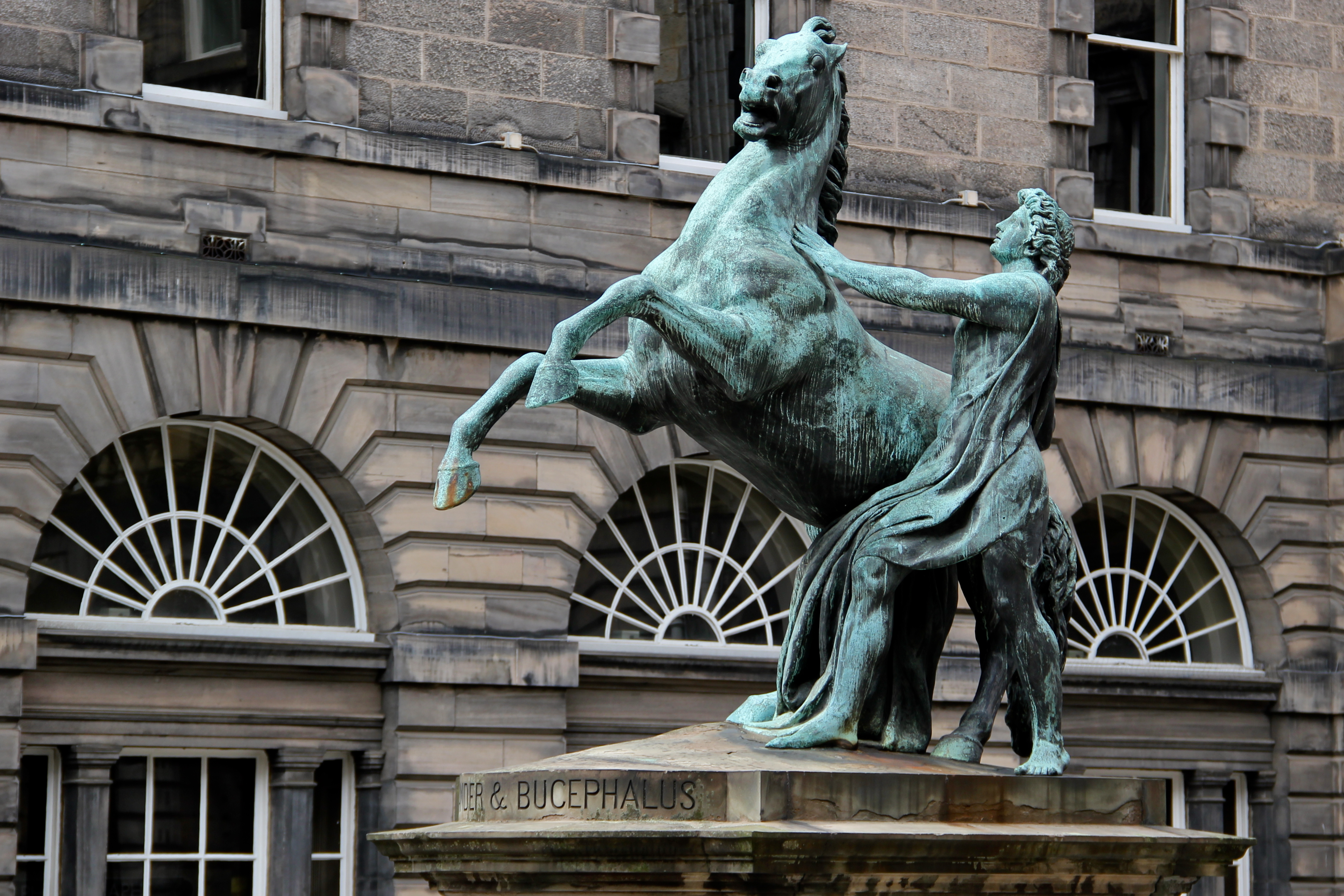
A statue by John Steell showing Alexander taming Bucephalus

A massive creature with a massive head, Bucephalus is described as having a black coat with a large white star on his brow. He is also supposed to have had a "wall eye" (blue eye), and his breeding was that of the "best Thessalian strain".

Plutarch says that in 344 BC, at twelve or thirteen years of age, Alexander of Macedonia won the horse by making a wager with his father: a horse dealer named Philonicus the Thessalian offered Bucephalus to King Philip II for the remarkably high sum of 13 talents. (Note: Loeb (1919) values one talent at £235, or $1,200; Thayer gives $15,600 (2007).) Because no one could tame the animal, Philip was not interested. However, Alexander was, and he offered to pay himself should he fail.

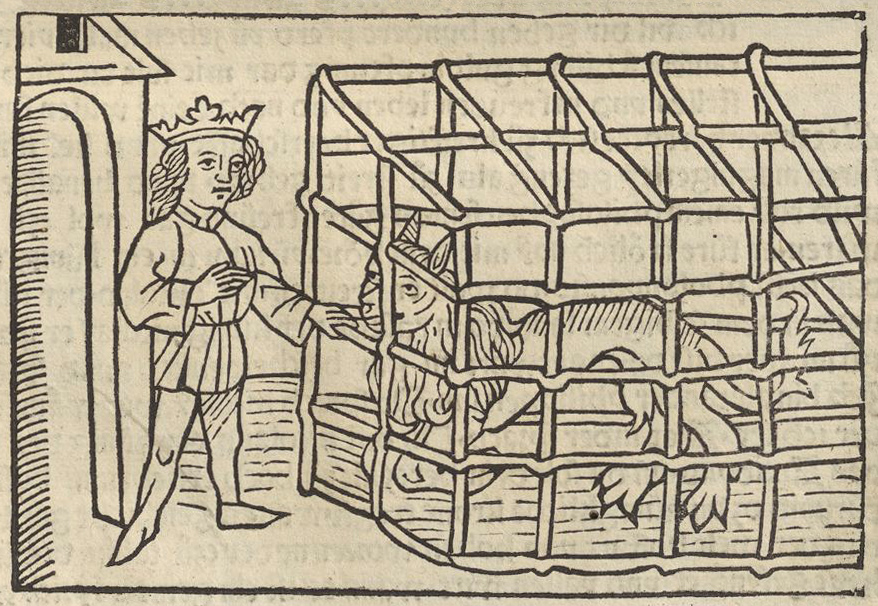
Alexander meets Bucephalus in a woodcut from the 15th-century Histori von dem Grossen Alexander by Johannes Hartlieb. In Hartlieb's version Bucephalus has the forelegs of a deer and the head of a lion.

Alexander was given a chance and surprised all by subduing the horse. He spoke soothingly to the horse and turned its head toward the sun so that it could no longer see its own shadow, which had been the cause of its distress. Dropping his fluttering cloak as well, Alexander successfully tamed the horse. Plutarch says that the incident so impressed Philip that he told the boy, "O my son, look thee out a kingdom equal to and worthy of thyself, for Macedonia is too little for thee." Philip's speech strikes the only false note in the anecdote, according to A. R. Anderson, who saw in these words the embryo of the legend more fully developed in the Alexander Romance.

In the Greek Alexander Romance, Bucephalus is brought to the Macedonian court as a colt of great size and ferocity. Because he is a man-eater, he is confined in an iron cage, and Philip feeds him robbers and other criminals. When Philip asks the Delphic oracle who will be his successor, he is told that someone who can leap onto Bucephalus and ride him through the center of Pella will rule the entire world. One day, when Alexander is fifteen, he passes by the cage of Bucephalus and hears the horse's terrifying whinny. He asks his companions about the sound, and Bucephalus, hearing his voice, becomes calm and acknowledges Alexander as his master. Alexander jumps onto his back and rides through Pella, and Philip, remembering the oracle, greets him as the ruler of the world.

== Alexander and Bucephalus ==
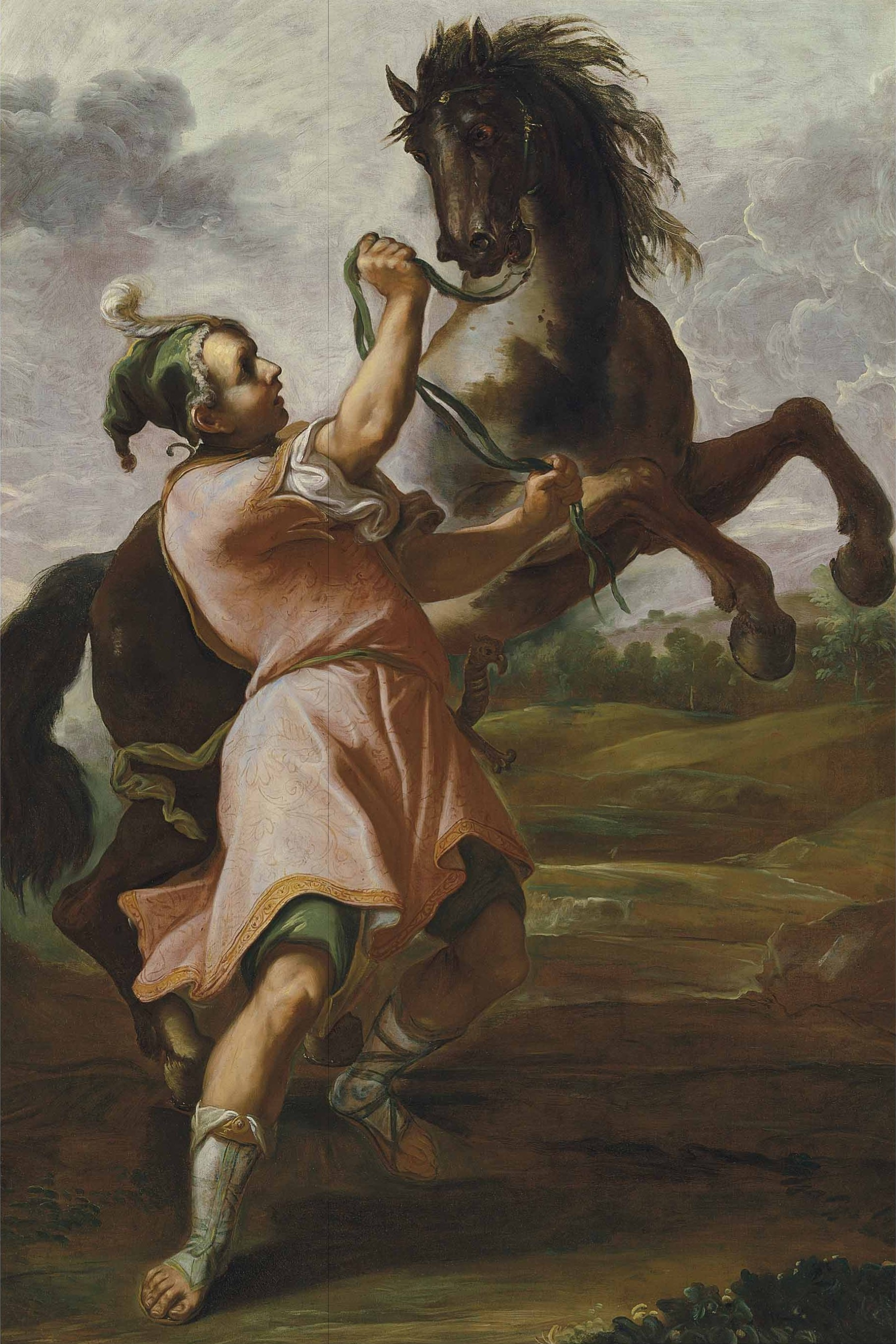
Alexander and Bucephalus by Domenico Maria Canuti, 17th century

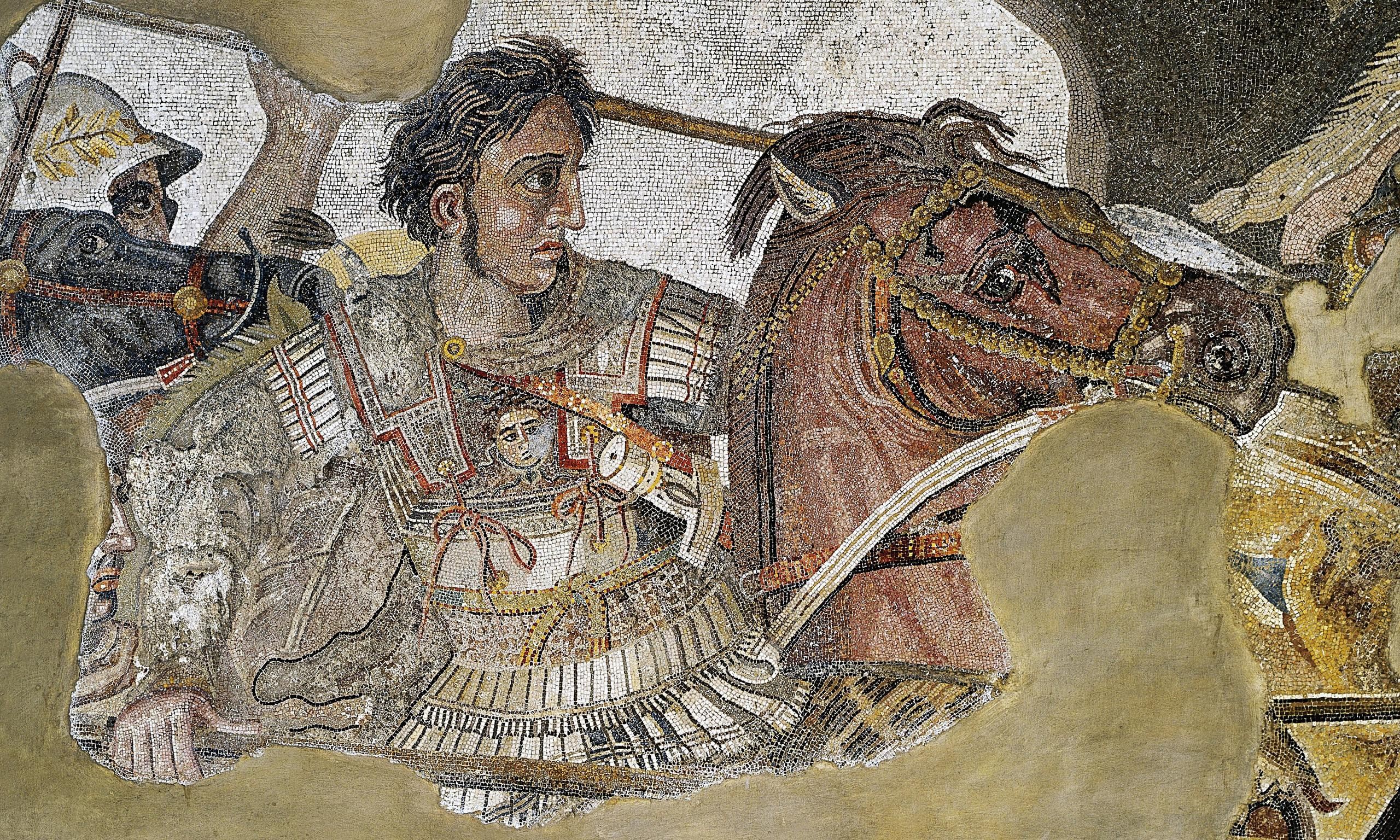
Alexander and Bucephalus in combat at the Battle of Issus portrayed in the Alexander Mosaic

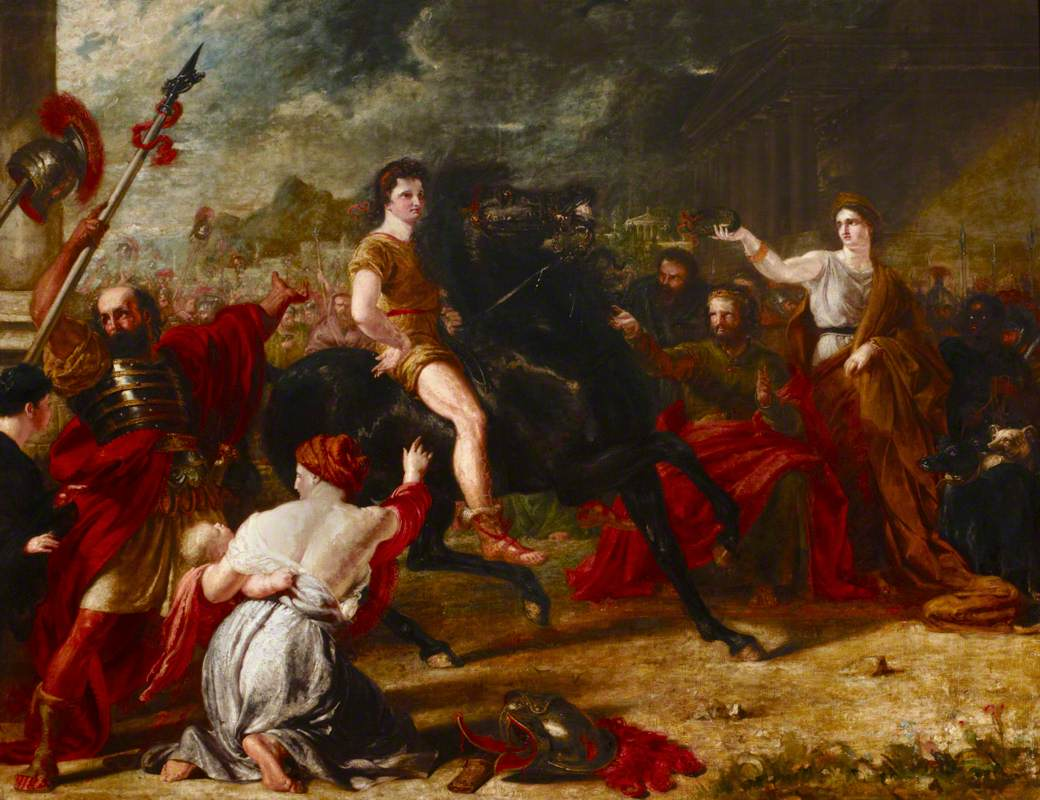
Alexander the Great Taming Bucephalus by Benjamin Robert Haydon, 1826

As one of his chargers, Bucephalus served Alexander in numerous battles.

The value which Alexander placed on Bucephalus emulated his hero and supposed ancestor Achilles, who claimed that his horses were "known to excel all others—for they are immortal. Poseidon gave them to my father Peleus, who in his turn gave them to me."

The ancient sources disagree about the cause of Bucephalus's death. Arrian states that he died near the Hydaspes from toil and old age, at about thirty years old, and explicitly says that he had not been wounded. Plutarch, by contrast, reports that most writers said he died some time after the battle while being treated for wounds, whereas Onesicritus attributed his death to old age and exhaustion. Arrian reports also the tale that Bucephalus lost his life due to fatal injuries at the Battle of the Hydaspes, though he himself dismisses this.

Alexander promptly founded a city, Bucephala, in honour of his horse. It was on the west bank of the Hydaspes river (modern-day Jhelum in Pakistan). The modern-day town of Jalalpur Sharif, outside Jhelum, is said to be where Bucephalus is buried.

The legend of Bucephalus grew in association with that of Alexander, beginning with the fiction that they were born simultaneously: some of the later versions of the Alexander Romance also synchronized the hour of their death. Bucephalus appears in almost all versions of the Armenian Alexander Romance, and visual illustrations in the surviving manuscripts of this text sometimes represent scenes with Bucephalus. According to Alexander Hebrew Romance Bucephal (called in this account "Busifal") died at the same day as did Alexander and Roxana's first-born son (whom the account names "Alexander"), and the two were buried together in the grand mausoleum erected by the King; historically, the boy died in the fall 326 BC, few months after the horse.

In some versions of the Alexander Romance Bucephalus devours Alexander’s assassin.

== In popular culture ==
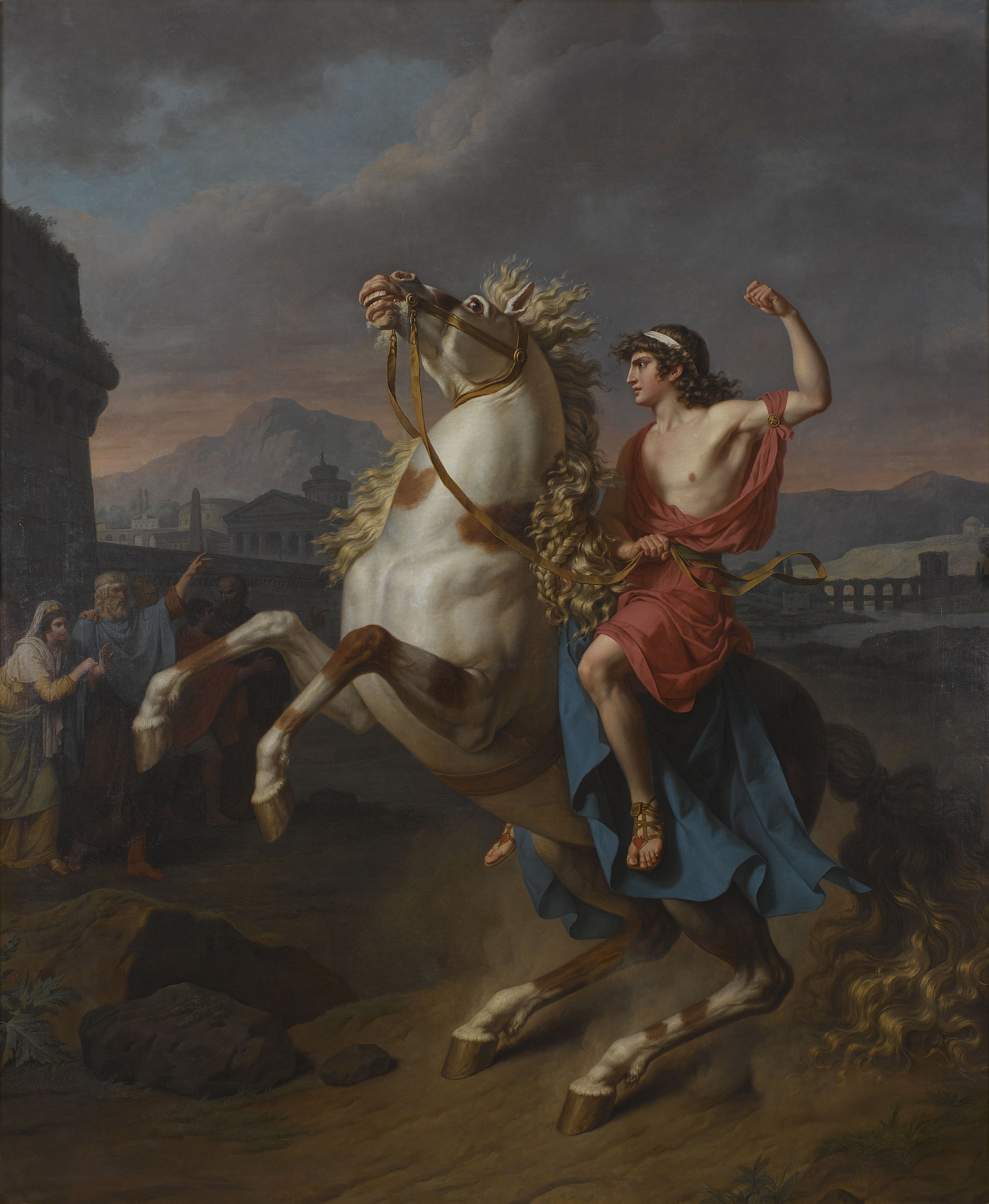
Alexander Taming Bucephalus by Nicolas-André Monsiau, 1787

Several novels use "Bucephalus" as the name of a horse, often in a symbolic manner. For example, in Colleen McCullough's novel Fortune's Favorites (third volume in the Masters of Rome series), young Julius Caesar secretly owns a horse he names Bucephalus; and his mother reads through it as an indication of his future ambitions.

In Franz Kafka's short story "The New Advocate", the lawyer in the story is described as resembling Bucephalus.

Bucephalus is the name of the horse belonging to the titular character in Terry Gilliam's 1989 fantasy film The Adventures of Baron Munchausen.

== See also ==
- List of historical horses
