= Alexander Taming Bucephalus (painting) =

Painting by [Nicolas-André Monsiau

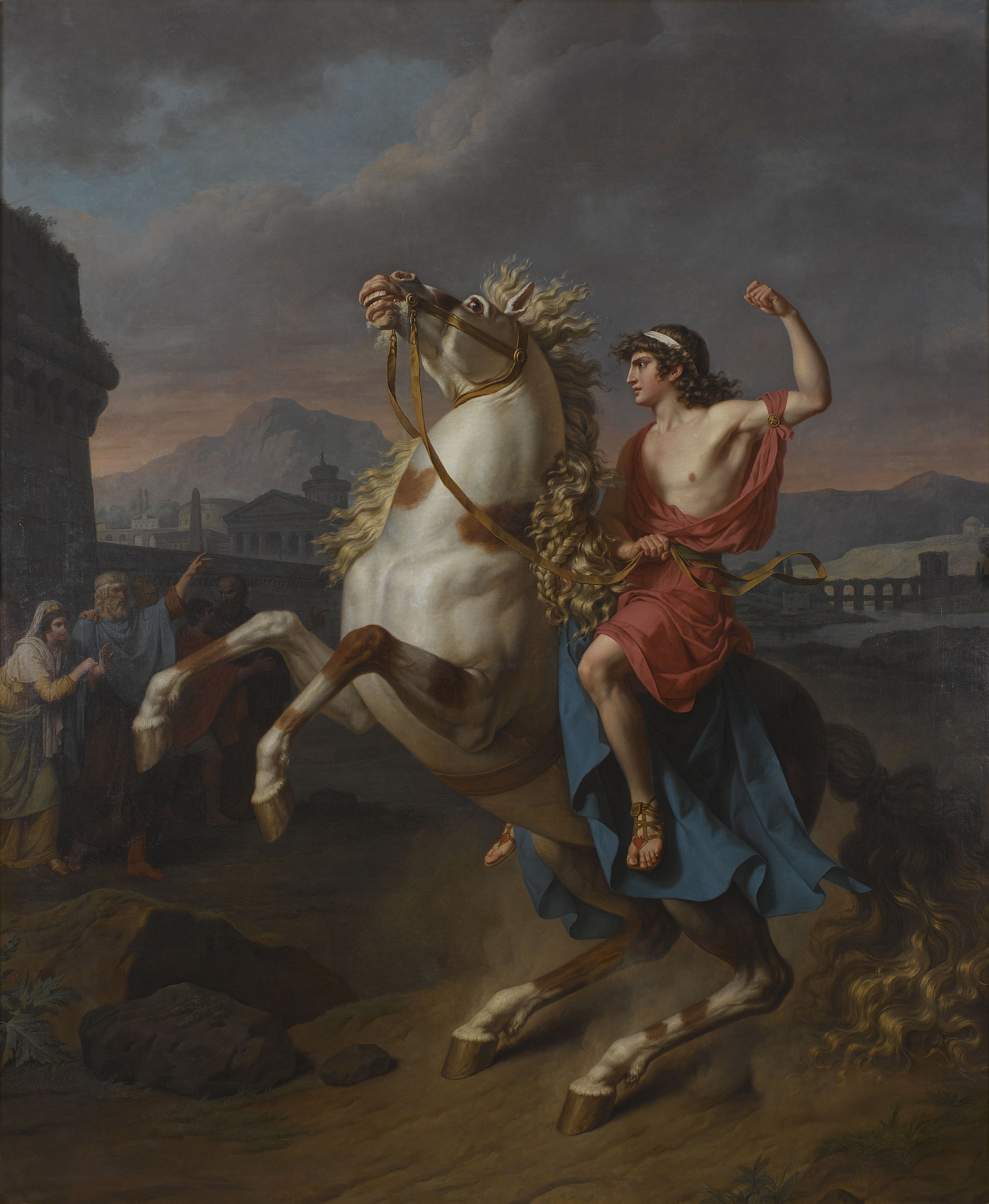
- Artist: Nicolas-André Monsiau
- Year: 1787
- Type: Oil on canvas, history painting
- Dimensions: 300 cm × 248 cm (120 in × 98 in)
- Location: Château de Maisons, Paris

Alexander Taming Bucephalus (French: Alexandre domptant Bucéphale) is a 1787 history painting by the French arist Nicolas-André Monsiau. It depicts Alexander the Great mastering the ferocious warhorse Bucephalus Distinctly Neoclassical in style the large painting was a likely influence on Jacques-Louis David for his later Napoleon Crossing the Alps.

The painting was displayed at the Salon of 1787 held at the Louvre in Paris. Today it is part of the collection at the Château de Maisons on the outskirts of the city.

== See also ==
- Alexander the Great Taming Bucephalus, an 1826 painting by Benjamin Robert Haydon

== Bibliography ==
- Allard, Sébastien. Portraits publics, portraits privés, 1770-1830. Réunion des Musées nationaux, 2006.
- Bordes, Phillipe. Jacques-Louis David: Empire to Exile. Yale University Press, 2007.
