= The New Advocate =

"The New Advocate" (German: "Der neue Advokat") is a short story from A Country Doctor by Franz Kafka. It is a very brief piece, described by some as a poem, that illustrates Kafka's view of lawyers. A new advocate, who metaphorically resembles Bucephalus, has been admitted to the Bar. The narrator contrasts the conditions prevailing in Bucephalus's time with those of modernity; while, like many of Kafka's stories (and especially his shorter writings), the story retains a high degree of ambiguity, the thesis advanced appears to be that advocates operating within a system embodying the rule of law are like heroes' steeds, though in an age without heroes. The work ends on an optimistic note (albeit one that could be interpreted as ironic), in which the narrator wonders whether the advocate, who is distinguished by the study of ancient texts and the pursuit of high-minded or even impossible ideals, might represent the consummation of human flourishment.

One scholar has therefore suggested that this story had a powerful therapeutic function in Kafka's confrontation of his own mortality, especially against the background of the strong legal and interpretive tradition characteristic of Jewish religiosity.
