= Bucephalus (brand) =

Branding mark used on horses in ancient Greece

Bucephalus (Ancient Greek: Βουκέφαλος, lit. 'ox-headed', from βοῦς, "ox", and κεφαλή, "head") was a type of branding mark used on horses in ancient Greece. It was one of the three most common, besides Ϻ, San, and Ϙ, Koppa. Those horses marked with a San were called Σαμφόραι, Samphórai; those with a Koppa, Κοππατίαι, Koppatíai; and those with an ox's head, Βουκέφαλοι, Bucéphaloi.

This mark was stamped on the horse's buttocks and its harnesses, judging by the scholia on Aristophanes's The Clouds, Hesychius, and other works.

Alexander the Great's horse was named Bucephalus after this brand on its haunch.
