= Boukephala and Nikaia =

Ancient cities founded by Alexander the Great

Coordinates: 32°39′34″N 73°24′19″E

- The likely location of Boukephala and Nikaia in modern-day Pakistan
- Periods: Hellenistic and Mauryan

History
- Built: 326 BC
- Built by: Craterus, on the order of Alexander the Great

Boukephala (Ancient Greek: Βουκεφάλα) and Nikaia (Νίκαια) were two cities founded by Alexander the Great on either side of the Hydaspes (modern-day Jhelum River, Pakistan) during his invasion of the Indian subcontinent. The cities, two of many founded by Alexander, were built shortly after his victory over the Indian king Porus at the Battle of the Hydaspes in early 326 BC.

It is not certain which settlement had which name. Built on the site of the battlefield, the city on the eastern bank was most likely called Nikaia (from nike, lit. 'victory'), while its western companion was probably named after Alexander's horse Bucephalus, who died during or after the battle. Their construction was supervised by Craterus, one of Alexander's leading generals. Both cities initially suffered from the rains of the South Asian monsoon. Boukephala seems to have had a more distinguished legacy than Nikaia: mentioned by Pliny the Elder and Ptolemy, it appears in the 1st-century AD Periplus Maris Erythraei manuscript and on the later Tabula Peutingeriana map. The cities' precise locations are unknown, but it is considered likely that Boukephala was located in the vicinity of modern Jalalpur and that Nikaia was across the river near present-day Mong.

== Historical accounts ==
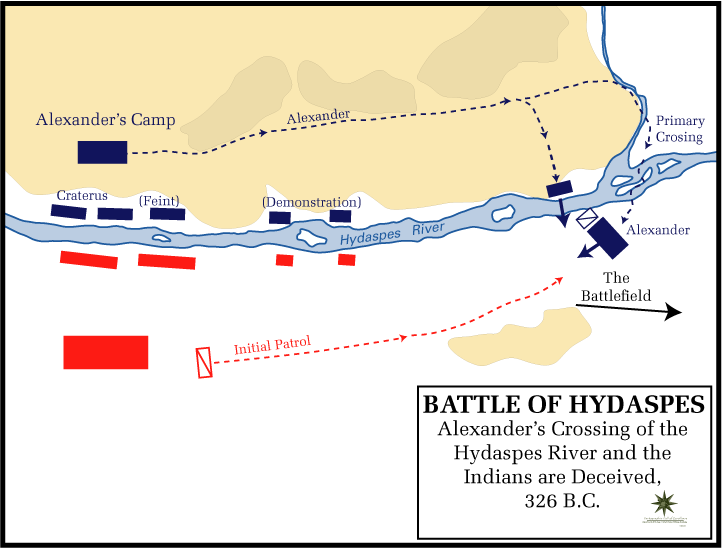
The formations and manoeuvres of the Macedonian and Indian armies before the Battle of the Hydaspes

=== Foundation ===
Alexander the Great, king of Macedon (r. 336–323 BC), invaded the Persian Achaemenid Empire in 334 BC. He decisively defeated the Persian king Darius III (r. c. 380 – 330 BC) at the battles of Issus (333 BC) and Gaugamela (331 BC), taking control of much of West Asia. Alexander then campaigned successfully against Bessus, the satrap of Bactria, who had murdered Darius and proclaimed himself Artaxerxes V of Persia. After Bessus' capture and execution, the Macedonian king moved southwards towards the Indus River to subdue local rulers. Capturing the fortress of Aornos, in present-day northern Pakistan, in April 326 BC, Alexander crossed the Indus to begin campaigning in northern India, executing a series of manoeuvres to cross the Hydaspes river (the modern-day Jhelum) and defeat the Indian king Porus at the Battle of the Hydaspes.

Accounts of the founding of two cities after the battle appear in the records of all of the five major surviving accounts—Arrian, Plutarch, Diodorus, Curtius Rufus, and Justin. All five agree that Alexander founded two cities, one on each side of the Indus, naming one Nikaia and the other Boukephala. Craterus, one of Alexander's leading generals, was appointed to construct and fortify the new cities, a task he had performed a few months earlier at Arigaion (an ancient city possibly located under modern Nawagai). Diodorus additionally records that the settlements were built quickly because many workers were available. Before moving onwards to continue his Indian campaign, Alexander celebrated his victory and foundations with what Arrian terms "a gymnastic and horse contest" near the western city. He returned to the cities a few months later after the Macedonian army had mutinied at the Hyphasis (modern-day Beas River) and forced him to turn back. The troops were ordered to help repair damage caused by the monsoon, a phenomenon previously unknown to the Macedonians, whose buildings were not designed to withstand heavy rains.

There is some dispute as to whether Alexander intended his foundations to be rapidly developing cities or military garrisons which would control the conquered territory; the historian N. G. L. Hammond theorised that Boukephala and Nikaia, founded on the banks of a major river, must have been established with trade routes in mind. According to Arrian, Alexander may have established dockyards at Boukephala, although Curtius Rufus states that these were located on the Acesines (modern-day Chenab River). Boukephala and Nikaia were also unique among the many cities founded by Alexander in not being at or near an existing fortress or provincial capital.

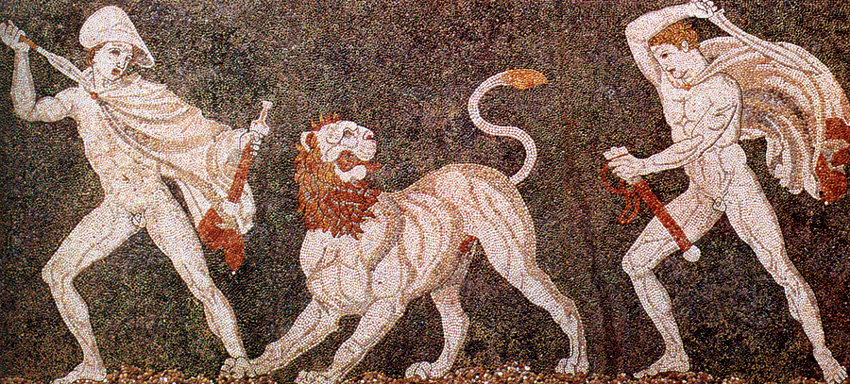
4th-century BC mosaic from Pella depicting Craterus (right) hunting lions alongside Alexander

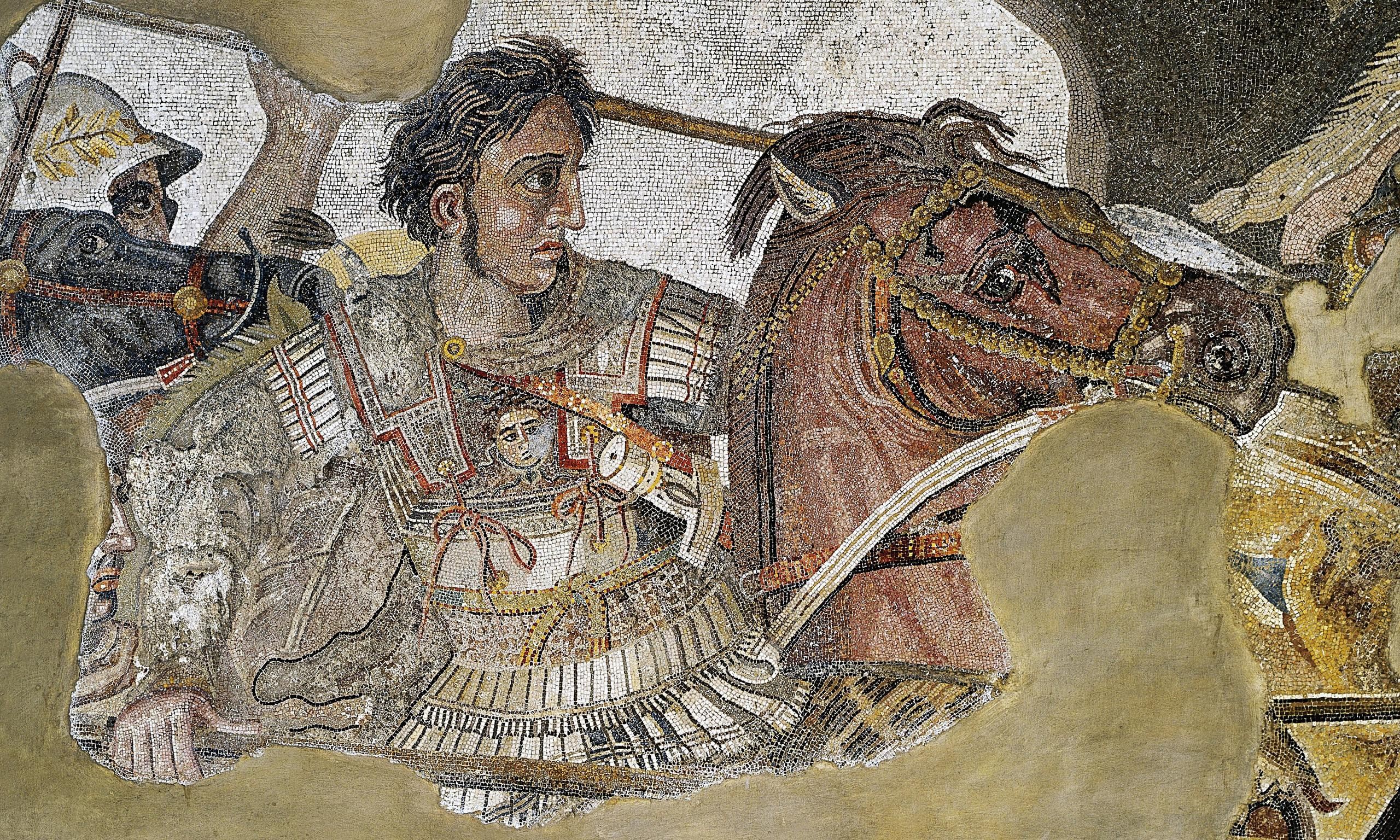
Bucephalus being ridden by Alexander in battle, as depicted in the Alexander Mosaic from Pompeii, circa 100 BC

The sources are however unclear on the details of the foundation and naming of the cities. Arrian separates the clauses detailing the location and naming of the cities, so that although the reader knows that one of the two cities was called Nikaia and one named Boukephala, it is unclear which name corresponds to which city. Though critical opinion has tended towards Nikaia being the eastern city, the historian A. B. Bosworth noted that this conclusion is somewhat tentative due to the grammatical uncertainties. None of the other sources give any more clarity to the situation, and it is possible that Arrian himself did not know which city was under which name.

There is also confusion on the timing of the death of Bucephalus, Alexander's horse, after whom Boukephala was named. Justin writes that he fell at the beginning of the Battle of the Hydaspes. Plutarch however mentions that Bucephalus died either from wounds or simple old age, "not at once, but some time afterwards". Arrian also states that Bucephalus, being around thirty years old, died unwounded of old age. As both Diodorus and Curtius Rufus separate the foundation of the cities from their naming, it is probable that the horse only died after Alexander's eastward departure, and that the settlements were named upon Alexander's return to the region.

=== Later history ===
Boukephala appears to have survived for some centuries; it was probably under the rule of the Mauryan Empire (existed c. 320–185 BC), while the later presence of the Indo-Greek kingdom (existed c. 170 BC–10 AD) in the area likely helped it to survive. In the twentieth century, the British classicist William Woodthorpe Tarn claimed that the settlement was the capital of the 1st-century BC Indo-Greek king Hippostratus, due to the presence of a symbol on his coinage which he claimed could only have been minted at a Greek city; this theory is considered flawed as no such coins have been found near the Hydaspes. Meanwhile, the Indian historian A. K. Narain questioned whether Boukephala still existed by the time of Menander I (c.150 BC), but this uncertainty is dispelled by the city's presence in the 1st-century AD Periplus of the Erythraean Sea, a guide for Roman merchant sailors.

Boukephala appears in many other Greco-Roman texts, including various recensions of the Alexander Romance and the writings of Ptolemy, and Pliny the Elder, who names the city as the chief of three controlled by the Asini tribe. It also appears on the Tabula Peutingeriana and in the writings of Yaqut al-Hamawi, a 13th-century AD Islamic scholar. Nikaia appears far less frequently in the ancient sources: it is possible that the name Alexandria for Porus, which is mentioned frequently, in fact refers to Nikaia.

Ancient sources are generally consistent in the naming of the cities. Boukephala is less frequently named "Boukephalia", or "Alexandria Boukephalos" in the Byzantine period. Alexander, who often founded cities after winning military victories, had a short time previously founded another settlement named "Nikaia" to the east of Paropamisadae. Tarn suggested that all of Alexander's foundations were called "Alexandria" and that any other names were merely nicknames; this conclusion is generally considered unfounded.

== Location ==
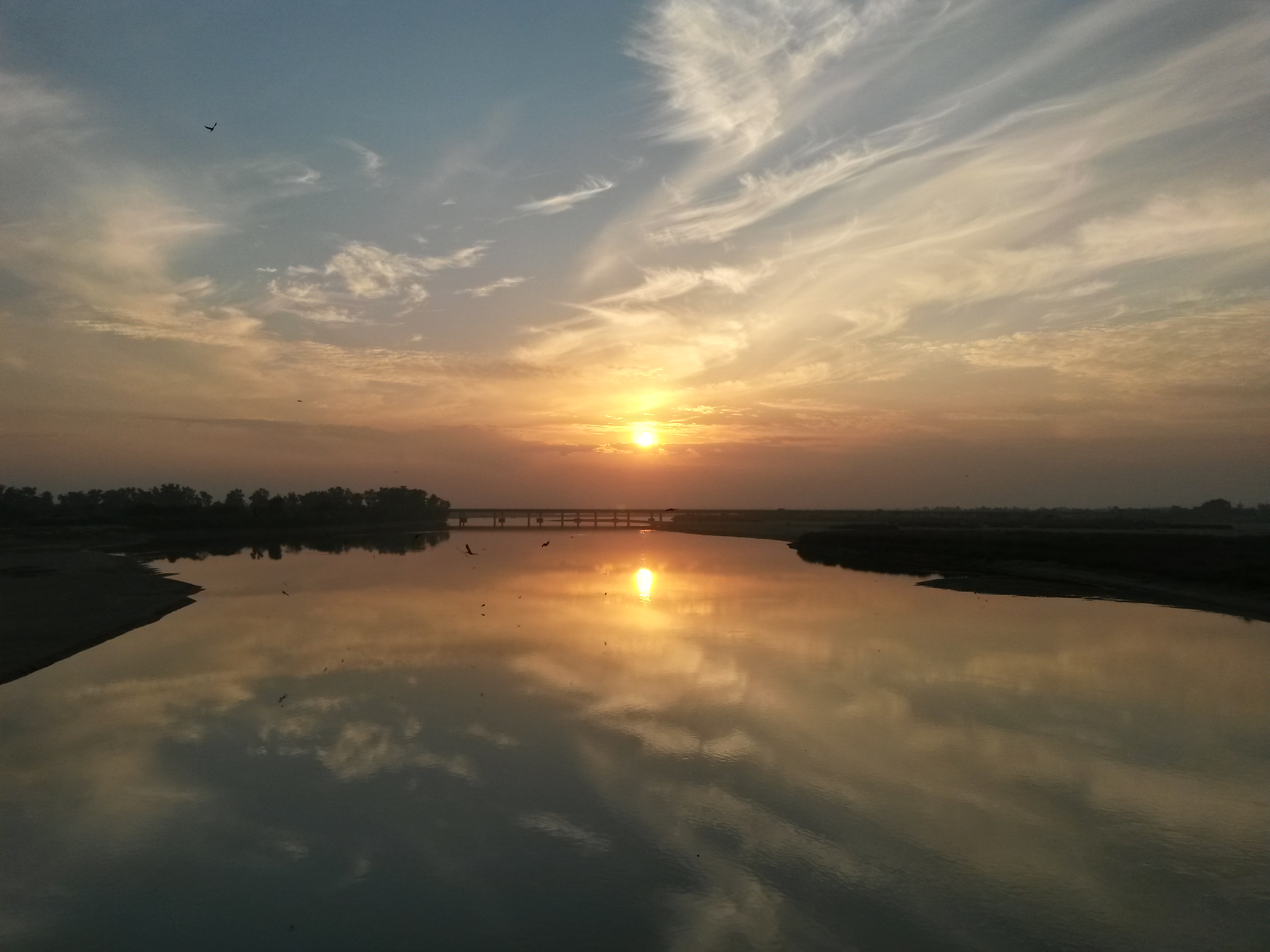
The Jhelum River as viewed from a bridge in Jhelum, formerly thought to be the site of Boukephala

According to the historian Getzel Cohen, the locations of Boukephala and Nikaia were already a matter of dispute in antiquity. As the path of the Jhelum has shifted consistently since antiquity, creating marshlands on the eastern side, and as the Indian monsoon was already damaging the cities in Alexander's time, it is unlikely that much of either city survives today, even at a great depth. Although some historians have placed Boukephala at the town of Jhelum or at a tell near Dilawar, the prevailing view, as proposed by the archaeologist Aurel Stein in 1932, is that it lies underneath the modern town of Jalalpur Sharif. A monument to the life of Alexander was thus built between 1998 and 2011 near the town; funded by the Government of Pakistan, the Greek embassy in Islamabad, and by private donations, it had become dilapidated by 2023.

As Boukephala was located across the river from Nikaia, if the former was located at Jalalpur, the most likely site of the latter is the town of Mong, located 10 kilometres (6.2 mi) to the east across the river. This hypothesis was suggested by Alexander Cunningham during the first Archaeological Survey of India. Others have suggested that the settlement is located near the present-day village of Sukchainpur. On the other hand, Stein considered it impossible to determine the site's location.

A reference to the two cities may appear in the Mulasarvastivada Vinaya, a tripitaka text of an early Buddhist school which likely dates from the time of the Kushan emperor Kanishka (r. c. 127 – 150 AD). The vinaya, which details one of the journeys of the Buddha, refers to two cities called Ādirājya ("Place of the First Kingship") and Bhadrāśva ("Place of the Good Horse") located on the Vitastā (i.e., Hydaspes) River along the road from Gandhara to Mathura. Although the Buddha connected these cities to the mythical king Mahāsammata, it is possible that they were in reality the cities of Boukephala and Nikaia. Similarly, an old Hindu tradition at a shrine to Mangla Devi at the site of Garjak above Jalalpur includes the story of the death of a magical horse.
