= Louis XVI Giving His Instructions to La Pérouse =

Painting by [Nicolas-André Monsiau

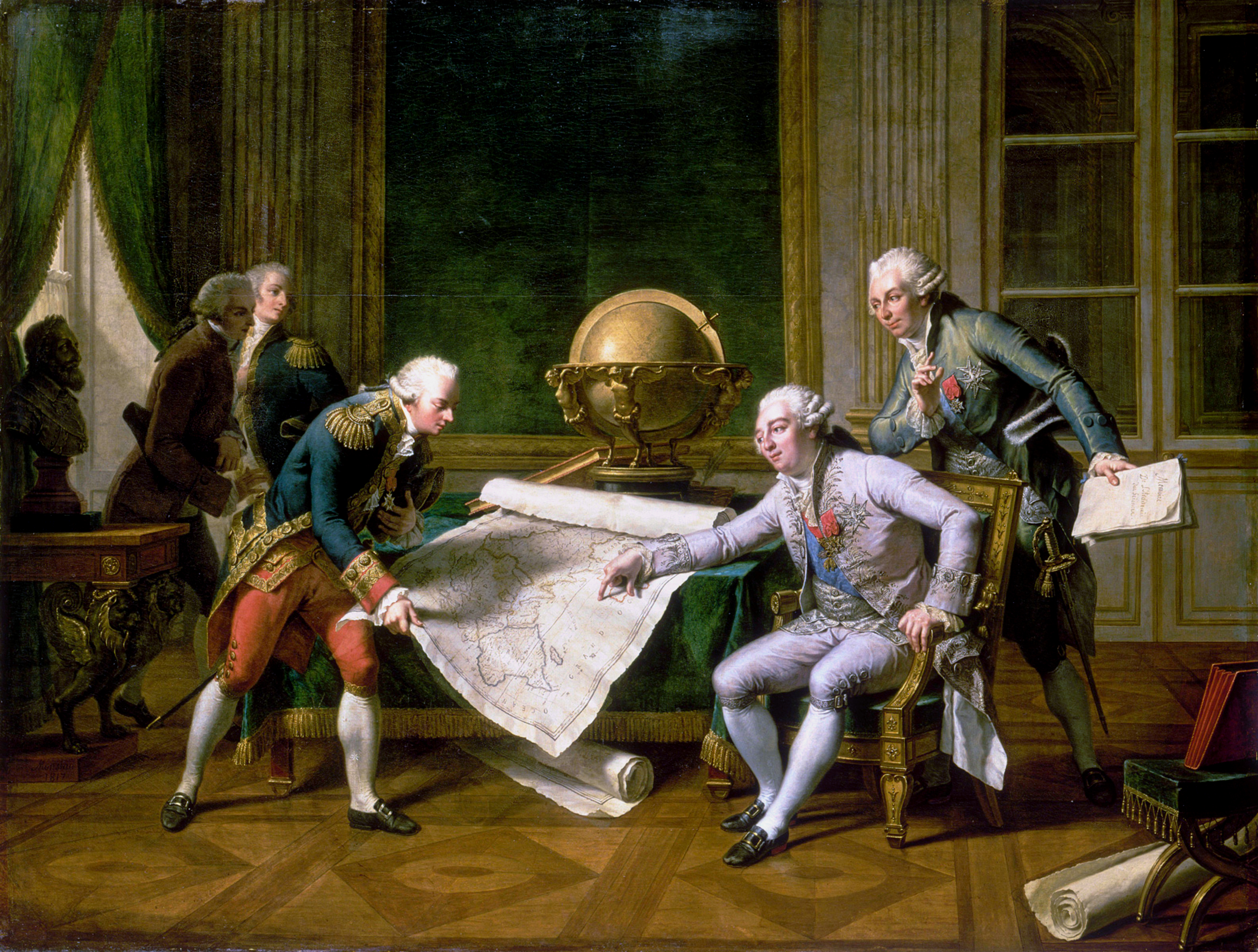
- Artist: Nicolas-André Monsiau
- Year: 1817
- Type: Oil on canvas, history painting
- Dimensions: 172 cm × 227 cm (68 in × 89 in)
- Location: Palace of Versailles, Versailles

Louis XVI Giving His Instructions to La Pérouse (French: Louis XVI donnant ses instructions à La Pérouse) is an oil on canvas history painting by the French artist Nicolas-André Monsiau, from 1817.

== History and description ==
It depicts Louis XVI issuing instructions to the French Naval officer and explorer Jean-François de Galaup, comte de Lapérouse in 1785 before he departed on his mission to travel around the world, which took in many countries before the expedition was wrecked at the Solomon Islands in 1788. The mission was seen as a riposte to the discoveries of the British explorer James Cook. Also present in the scene is the Marquis of Castries, Minister for the Navy.

The painting was produced following the Second Bourbon Restoration in 1815 and portrays a nostalgic view of the Ancien Régime before the French Revolution. The work was ordered by the French monarch Louis XVIII, the younger brother of the monarch portrayed. It was commissioned for 4,000 Francs for the royal residence the Tuileries Palace in Paris. It featured in the Salon of 1817 at the Louvre. It is now in the collection of the Palace of Versailles.

== Bibliography ==
- Ferrari, Anna (ed.) Versailles: Science and Splendour. Science Museum, 2025.
- Gaziello, Catherine. L'Expédition de La Pérouse : 1785-1788: Réplique française aux voyages de Cook. FeniXX, 1984.
