= Jalalpur Sharif =

Town in Punjab, Pakistan

Coordinates: 32°39′34″N 73°24′19″E

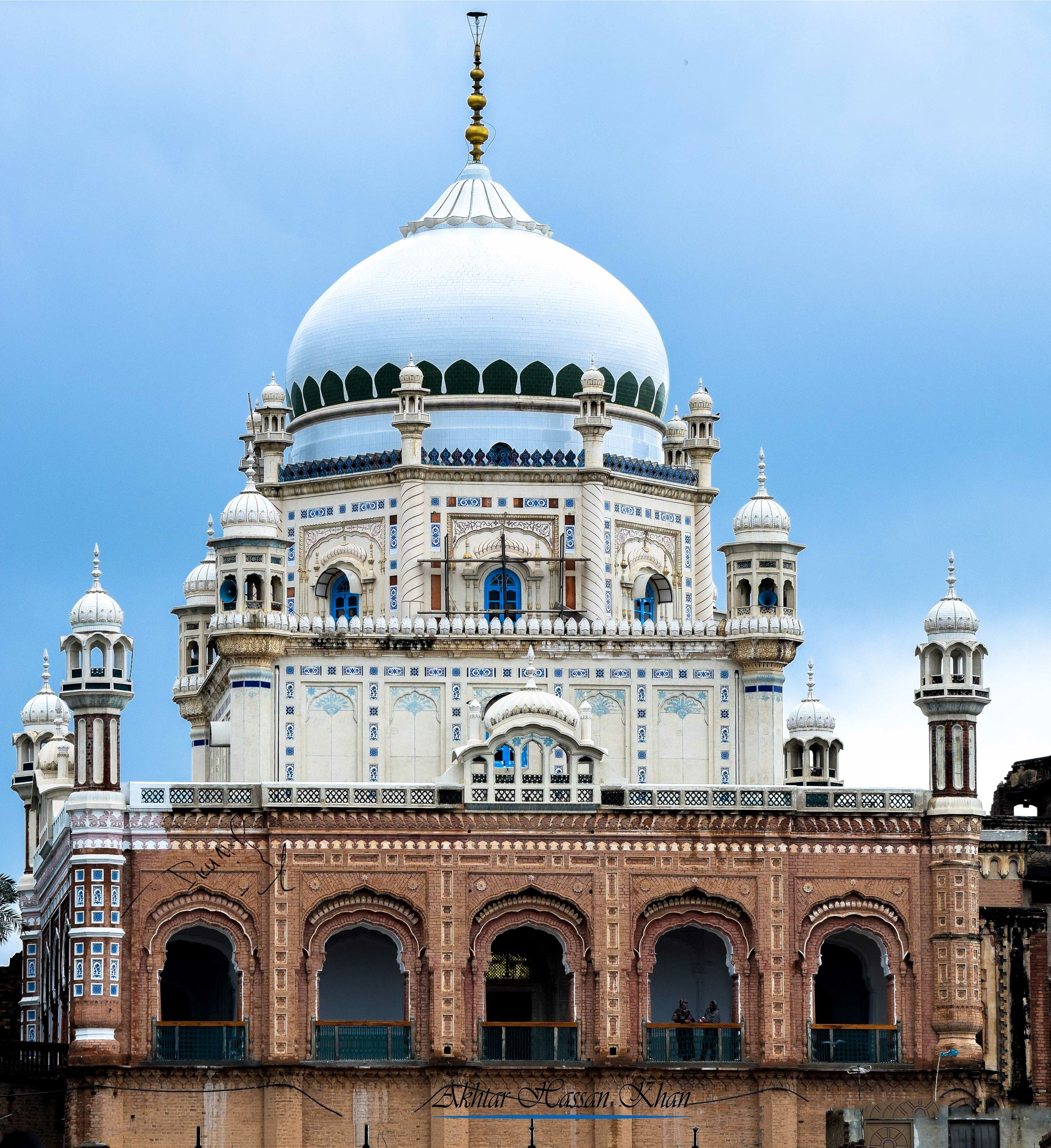
- Interactive map of Jalalpur Sharif
- Country: Pakistan
- Province: Punjab
- District: Jhelum
- Tehsil: Pind Dadan Khan

Population (2017)
  - Total: 10,527
- Time zone: UTC+5 (PST)
- Calling code: +92544

Jalalpur Sharif (Urdu: جلالپور شریف) is a town located in the Jhelum district in Punjab, Pakistan.

== History ==
Jalalpur's modern name came from the renaming of its ancient name, Girjak, by Malik Darwesh Khan Janjua who was a high-ranking general of the Mughal Army in Emperor Jalaluddin Muhammad Akbar’s reign.

It is stated that Malik Darwesh ordered the renaming of Girjak (part of his extended kingdom) to Jalalpur, when Emperor Akbar visited him. This was done in honour of the Emperor. Jalalpur at this point was a flourishing centre of trade for the region.

The history of the region dates back to 326 BC when Alexander the Great and his troops camped at Jalalpur Sharif, located on the right bank of the Jhelum River, prior to the Battle of the Hydaspes. During this battle, Alexander’s horse Bucephalus was severely injured and he was reportedly buried close to Jalalpur Sharif, where subsequently Alexander built the city of Bucephalia named after his horse.

A notable landmark of the town is the Shrine of Pir Syed Ghulam Haidar Ali Shah, a prominent leader of the Chishti order. It is this association with the shrine of one of the most well known Chishti spiritual leaders of the subcontinent that the title of Sharif is pronounced together with Jalalpur. Ghulam Haidar Ali Shah and his descendants, including his grandson Syed Fazal Shah were influential in the spiritual development of the Muslims of Punjab, and also in the political movement that eventually led to the creation of Pakistan.

The Khewra Salt Mines, the world's second largest salt mine, is located 37 km west of Jalalpur Sharif in Khewra.
