= Jacques-Philippe Caresme =

French painter (1734–1796)

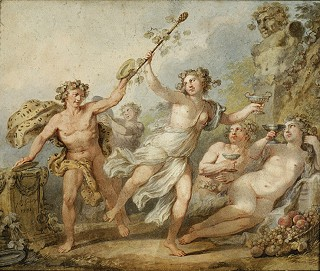
Jacques-Philippe Caresme, Bacantes, oil on panel. 23,5 x 29,5 cm. Museo Municipal de Vigo, Spain

Jacques-Philippe Caresme (1734 – 1796) was a French historical painter.

== Life ==
Caresme was born in Paris in 1734. He was probably a pupil of Charles-Antoine Coypel, and was admitted into the Academy while still young, but expelled eight years later. In 1781, when a royalist, he composed an allegorical design in commemoration of the birth of the Dauphin, and in 1794, after he had become an ardent republican, he presented the Commune of Paris with a drawing representing Joseph Chalier, the tyrant of Lyons, going to execution: both of these were engraved. He also painted a large Nativity of the Virgin for Bayonne Cathedral. He engraved, from his own designs, The Execution of the Marquis de Favras, February 19, 1790, and The Market-Women going to Versailles to compel the King to return to Paris, Oct. 5th, 1789.

He died in Paris in 1796.
