= Nicolas-André Monsiau =

French artist and draughtsman (1754-1837)

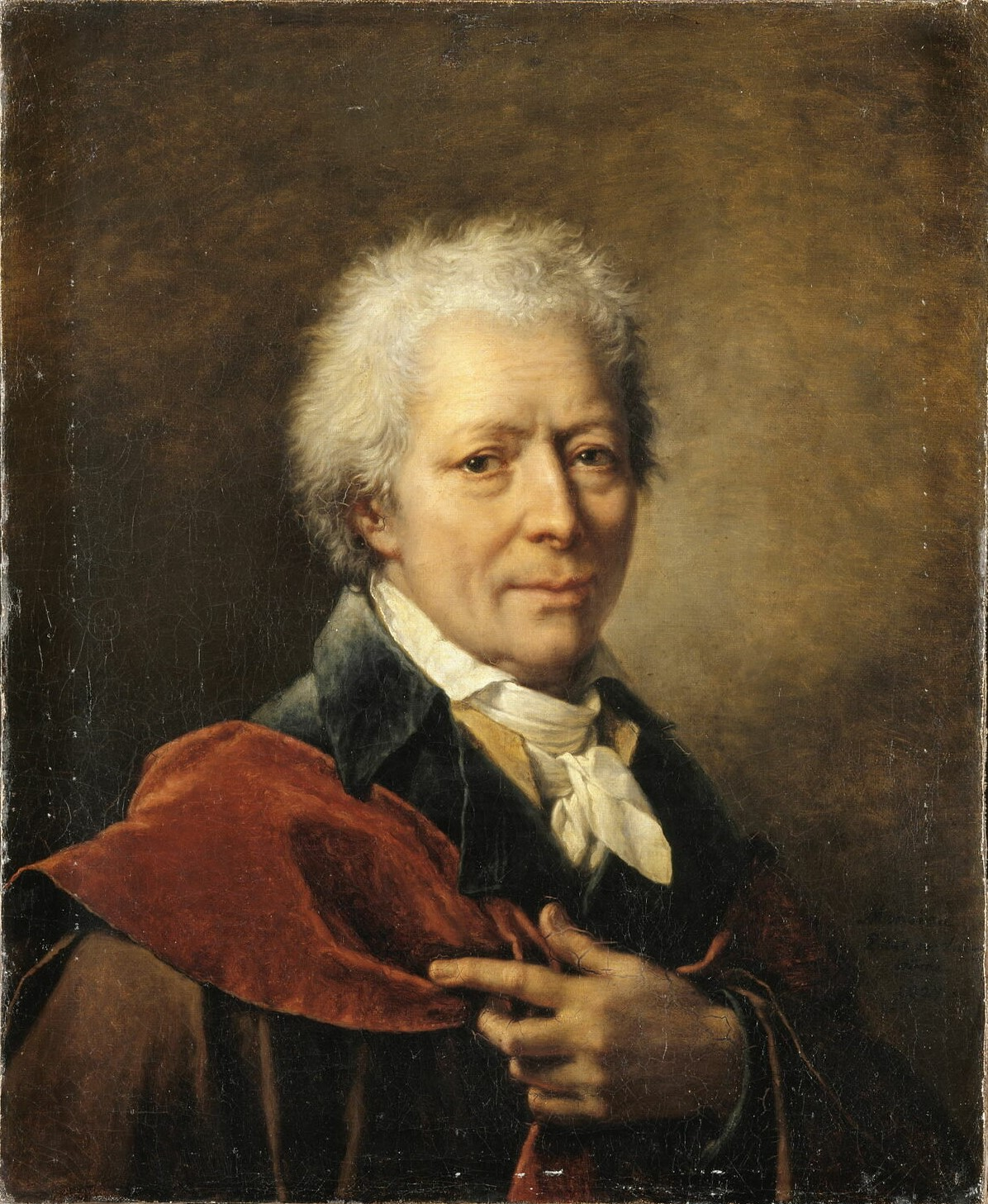
- Self-portrait of Monsiau in 1827
- Born: 1754; Paris, France
- Died: May 31, 1837 (aged 83); Paris, France
- Movement: Neoclassicism

Nicolas-André Monsiau (1754 – 31 May 1837) was a French history painter and a refined draughtsman who turned to book illustration to supplement his income when the French Revolution disrupted patronage. His Poussiniste drawing style and coloring marked his conservative art in the age of Neoclassicism.

== Background ==
His training at the school of the Académie royale de peinture et de sculpture, Paris, was under the direction of Jean-François Pierre Peyron. An early patron, the marquis de Corberon, paid for a sojourn at Rome, where he studied at the French Academy in Rome from 1776. On his return to Paris, he was unable to exhibit in the annual Paris Salon, which were closed to all but those who had been received ("agréé") by the Académie or were members, under the Ancien Régime. Instead he found an outlet in the smaller Salon de la corréspondance, where in 1782 he showed a tenebrist Piquant effect of the light of a lamp.

Two years later he was received at the Académie with a historical subject, Alexander taming Bucephalus and was made a member 3 October 1787, his second attempt, on the strength of The Death of Agis. The influence of Jacques-Louis David, an acquaintance from Monsiau's days in Rome, is most vividly represented by Monsiau's Ulysses, after returning to his palace and slaying Penelope's suitors, orders the women to remove the corpses (1791 Salon), where the action is played out in a shallow frieze-like space defined by a colonnade parallel to the picture plane.

In his best-known painting, Zeuxis choosing among the most beautiful girls of Crotona, shown at the Salon of 1791, Monsiau illustrates an anecdote of the painter Zeuxis, recorded in Pliny's Natural History, that exemplifies an essential aspect of the Classical approach to artistic creation, in the artist's refining an ideal Art by selecting from among the lesser beauties of Nature.

Monsiau's great public commission was a commemoration of the occasion on 26 January 1802, at which Napoleon delivered an authoritarian constitution to the Cisalpine Republic at a convocation of notables (the consulta) at Lyon. François Gérard had turned down the commission, preferring to continue his series of individual portraits of the Bonapartes. Monsiau received the commission in 1806; the finished painting was exhibited at the Salon of 1808 and was installed at the Tuileries the following year.

Monsiau was among the first history painters to depict scenes from modern history that were not commemorations of battles. He showed Molière reading Tartuffe at the house of Ninon de Lenclos at the Salon of 1802. It was engraved by Jean-Louis Anselin. His painting of Louis XVI giving instructions to the sea captain-explorer La Pérouse before his attempted circumnavigation was exhibited at the Salon of 1817 and was purchased for the recently restored Louis XVIII.

His portrayal of a sensational episode in which an escaped lion from the Grand Ducal menagerie in Florence had dropped a child it had picked up, without harming it, was exhibited at the Salon of 1801 and is conserved in the Louvre.

Among his pupils was the portrait draughtsman Louis Letronne (1790–1842), whose pencil portrait of Ludwig van Beethoven is iconic.

== Gallery ==
Works by Monsiau

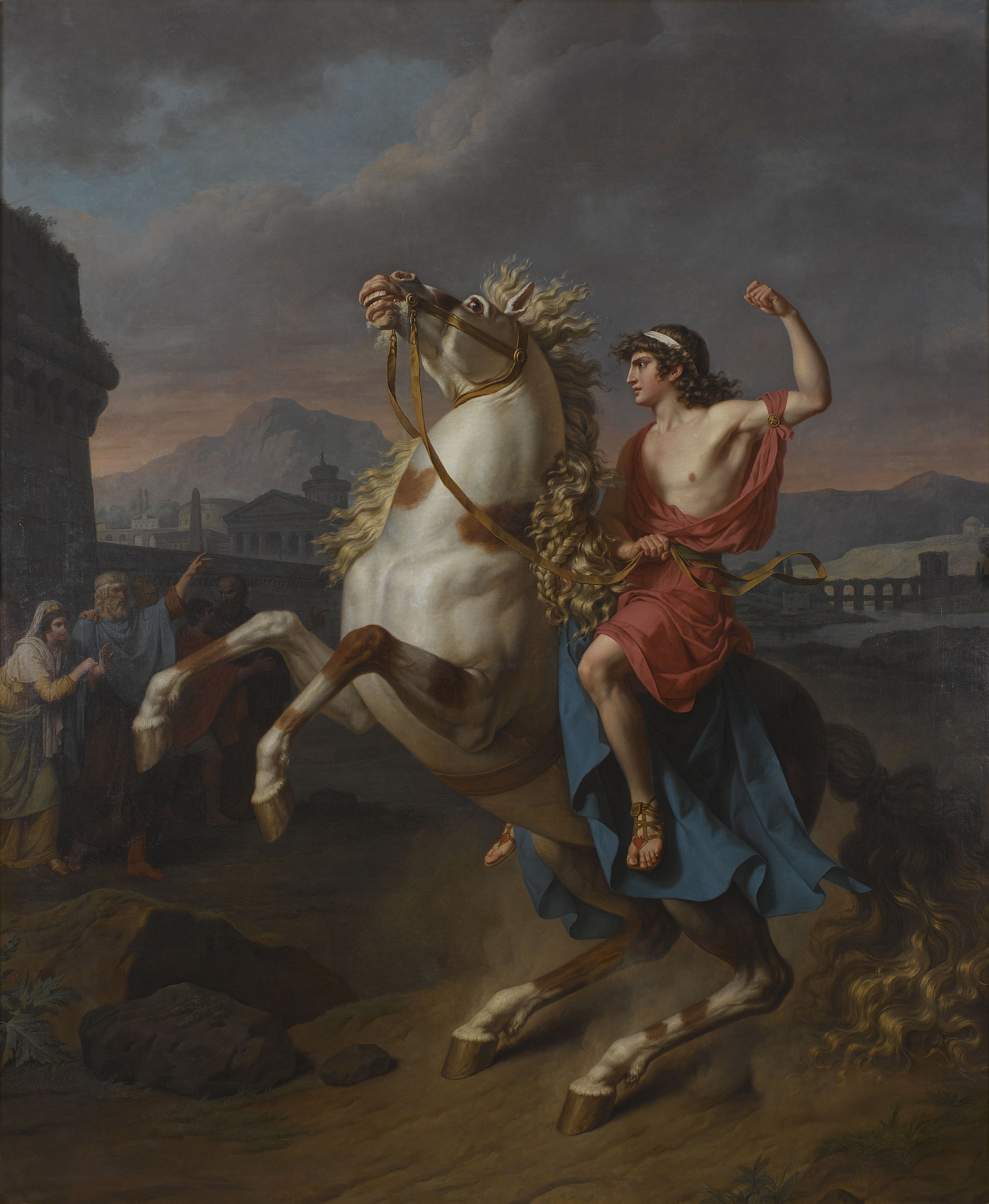
Alexander Taming Bucephalus (1787), Château de Maisons

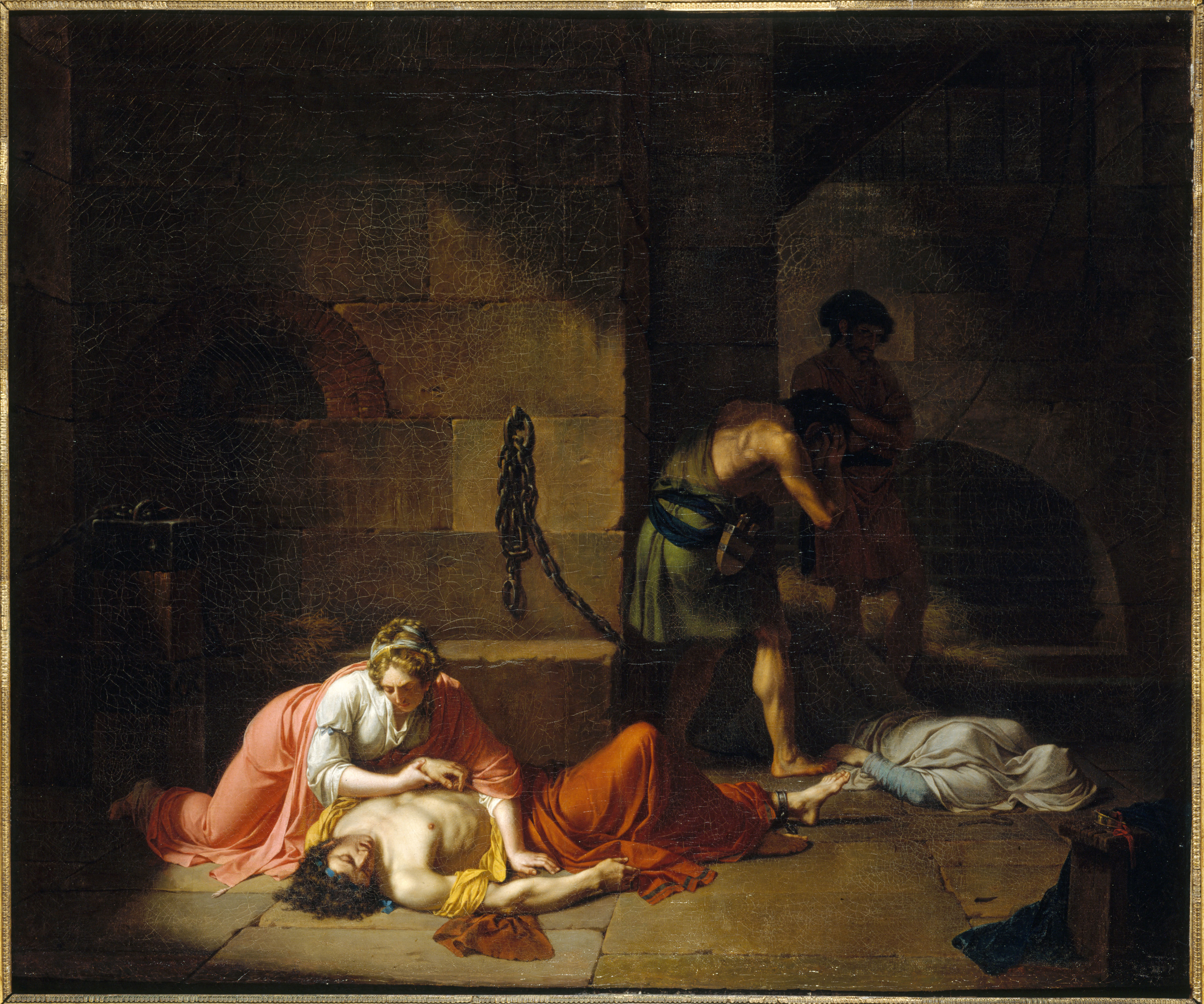
The Death of Agis (1789), Petit Palais

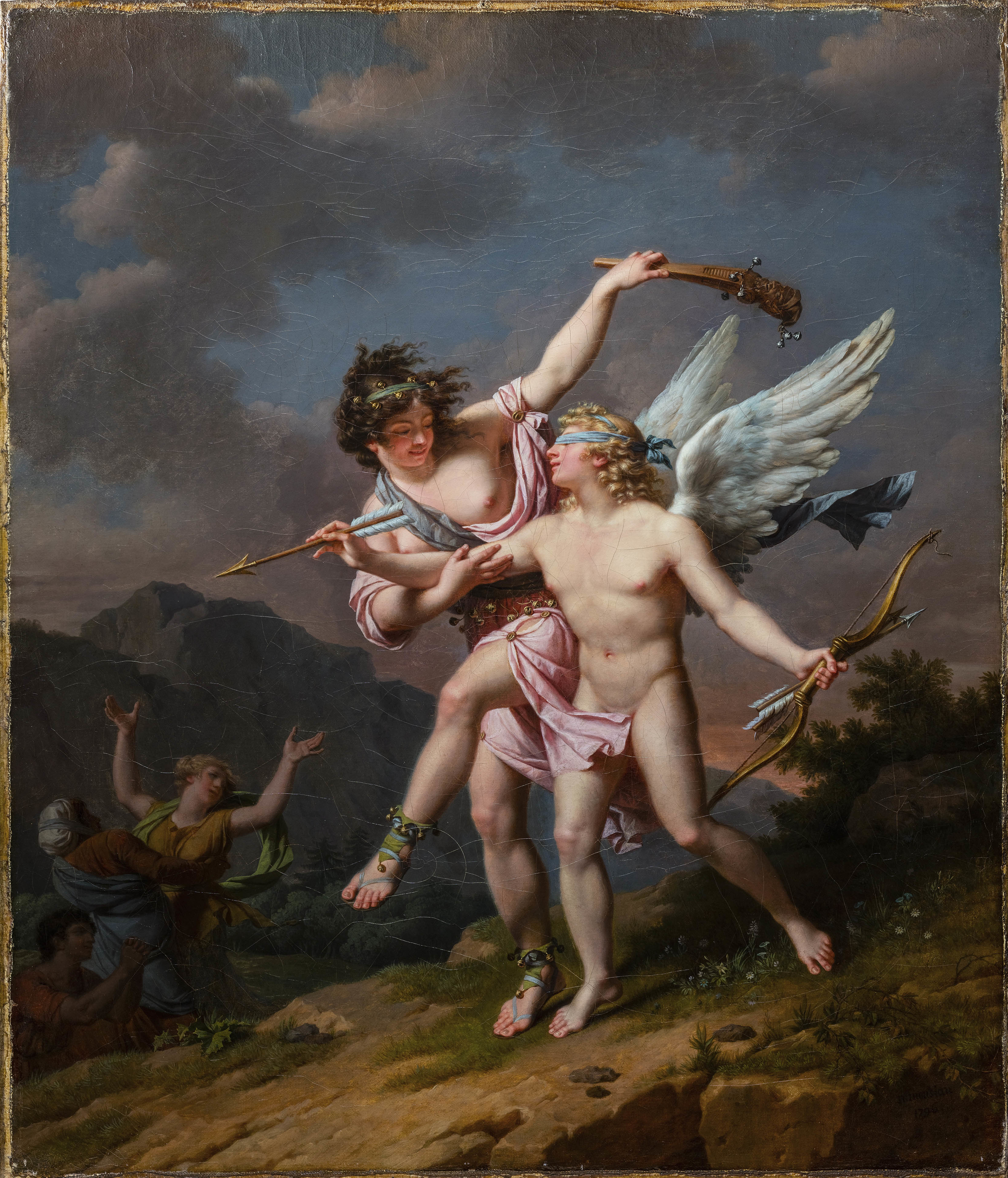
La Folie conduisant l'Amour aveugle (1796), Paris

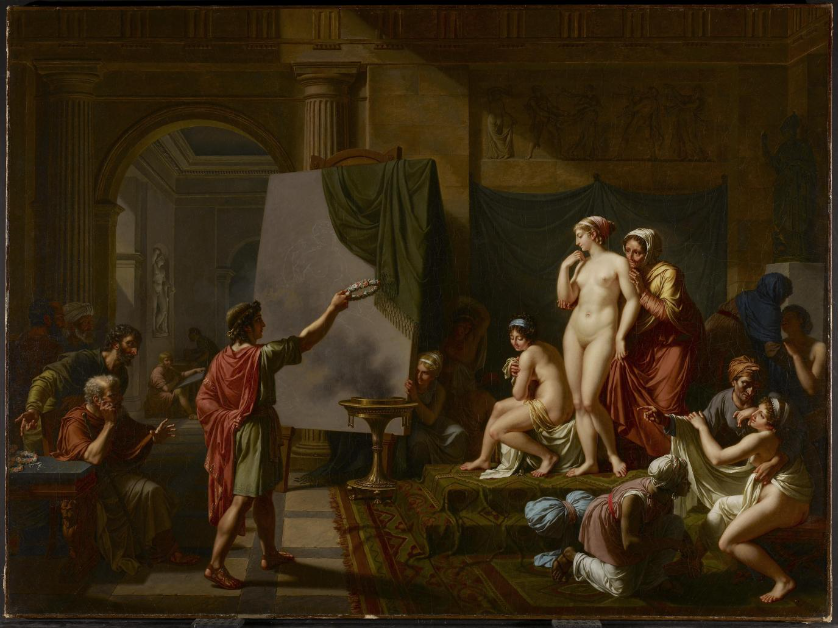
Zeuxis Choosing His Models (1797), Art Gallery of Ontario

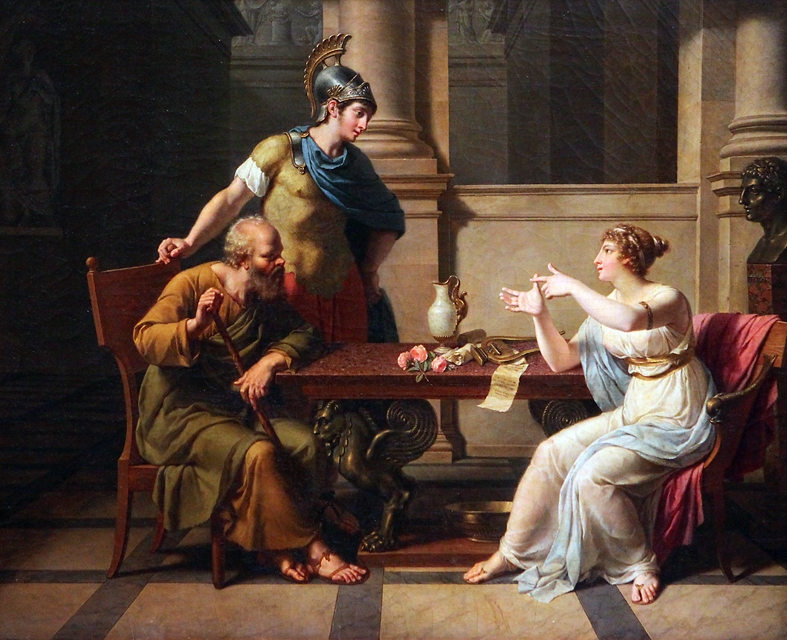
Aspasia Conversing with Socrates and Alcibiades (1801), Pushkin Museum.

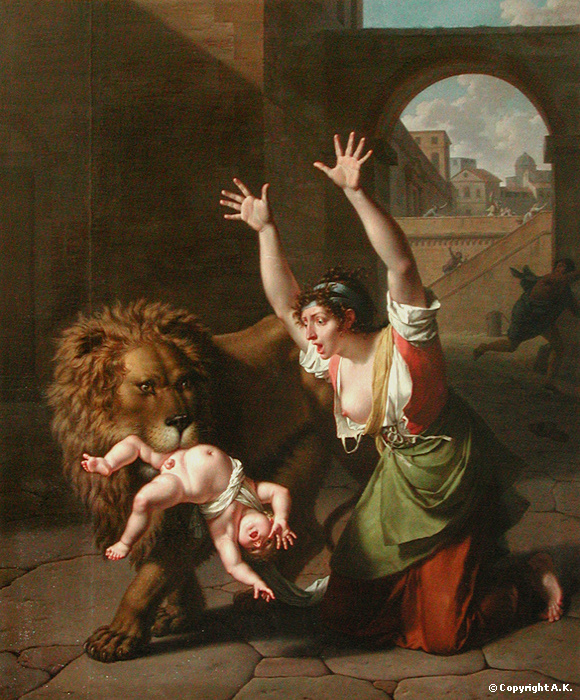
The Lion of Florence (1801),Louvre.

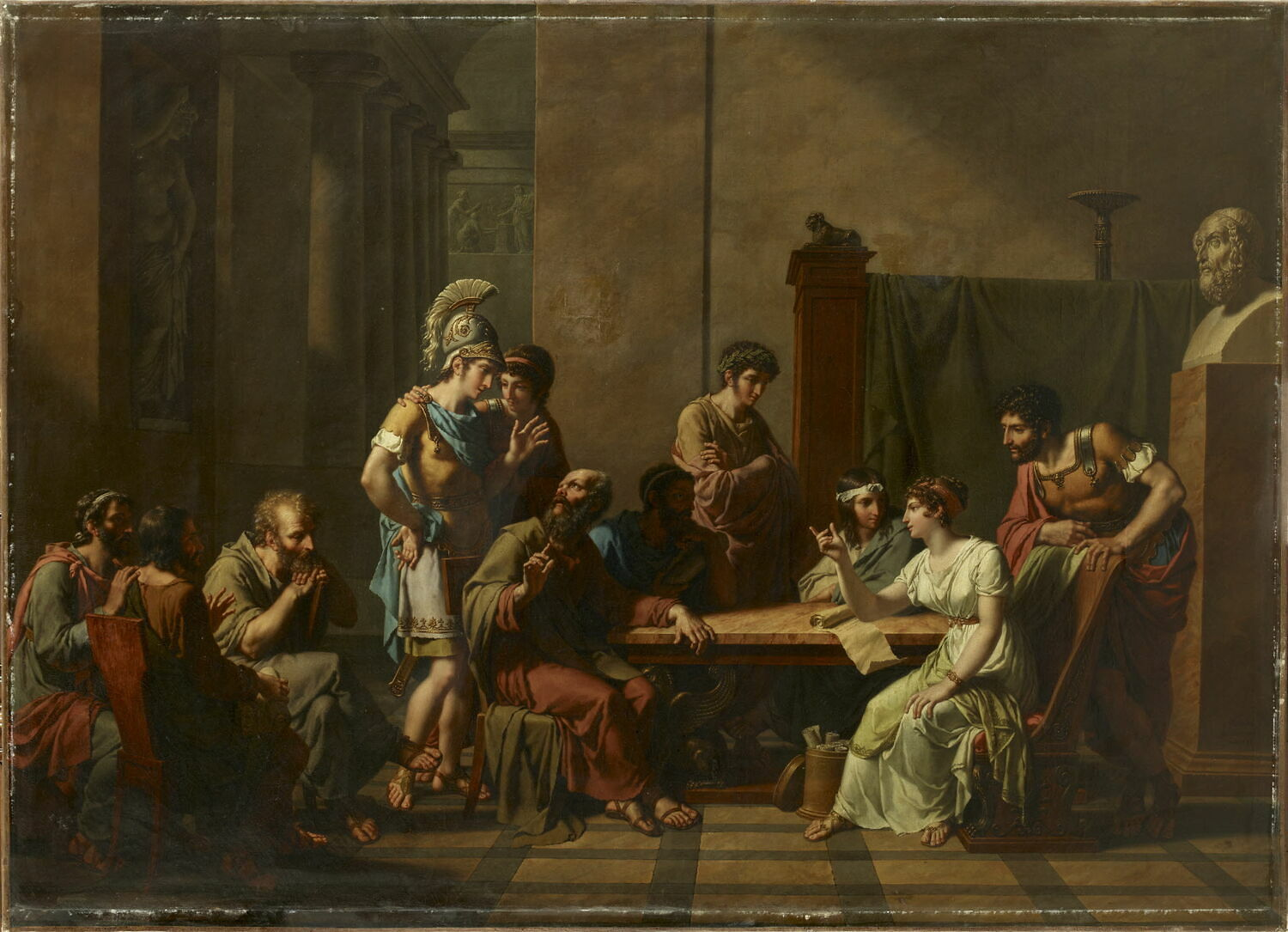
Aspasia Conversing with the Most Illustrious Men of Athens (1806)

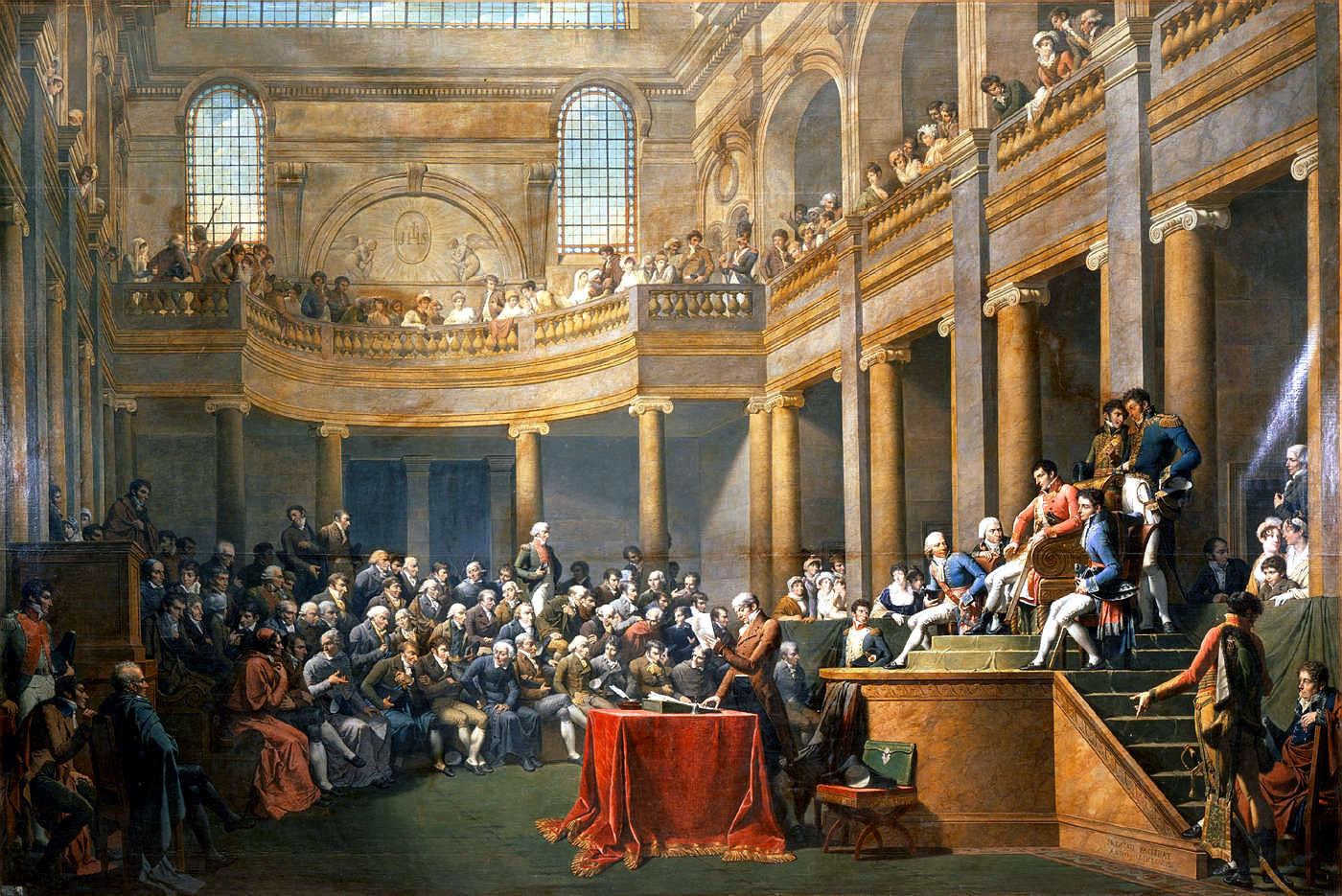
Les Membres de la Consulta de la République Cisalpine (1808), Versailles.

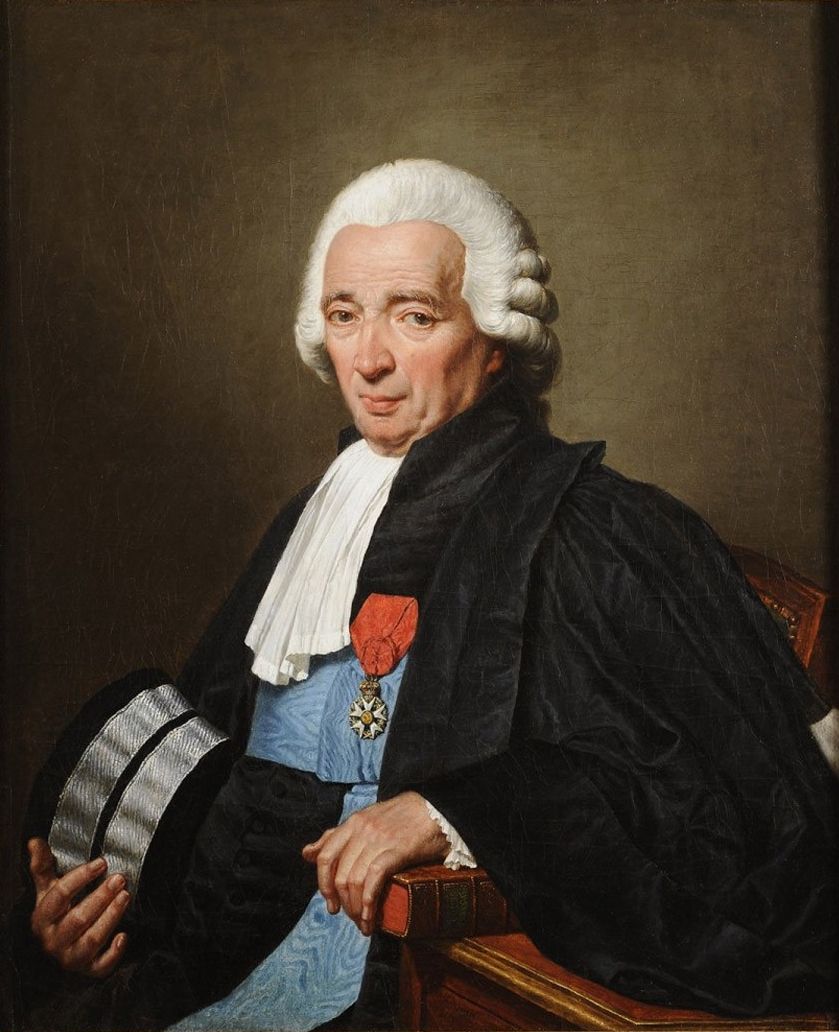
Portrait of President Thomas Berthereau (1811)

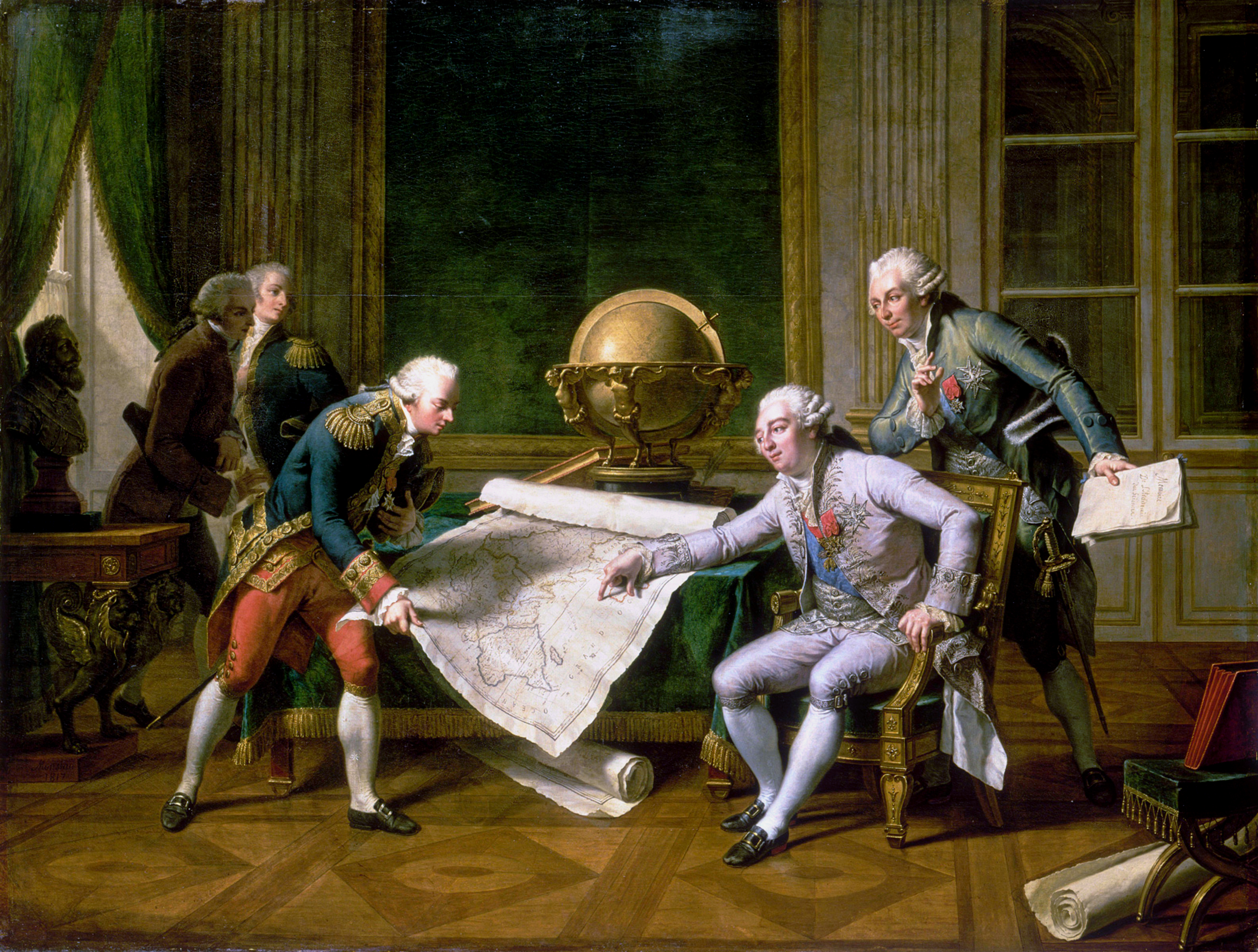
Louis XVI giving his instructions to La Pérouse, ship's captain for his voyage of exploration around the world, in the presence of the Marquis of Castries, Minister for the Navy, 29 June 1785 (1817), Versailles.

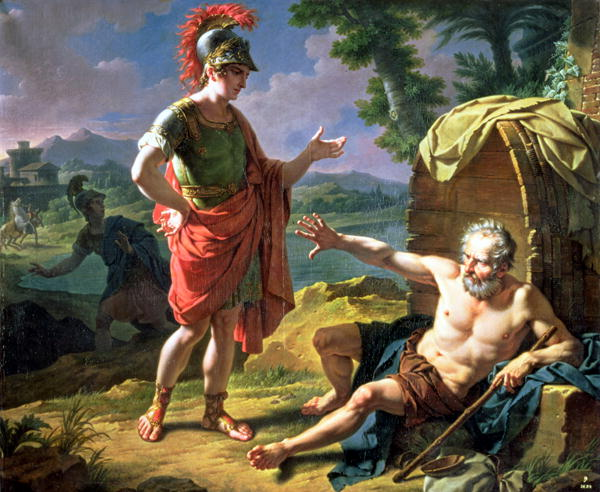
Alexandre et Diogène (1818),musée de Rouen.

== Sources ==
- Benezit, Dictionnaire des Peintres, Sculpteurs, Dessinateurs et Graveurs.
