= Periods of stagflation in Pakistan =

Pakistani economic historical periods

The Periods of Stagflation, also known as Stagflation in Pakistan or inflation and unemployment in Pakistan, are periods of economic stagflation in Pakistan's economic history, which has affected Pakistan's economic trajectory since its inception. Pakistan's economy is battling a state of virtual "stagflation", means that Pakistan is grappling with the challenging conditions of sluggish economic activity, rising unemployment and rising inflation.

The first period of stagflation began in the 1970s after the secession of East Pakistan and the formation of Bangladesh following the surrender during the Bangladesh Liberation War. Although the government of Zulfikar Ali Bhutto made an attempt to end this period, it was subsequently ended by the military government of Zia-ul-Haq in the 1980s. The end of Soviet engagement in Afghanistan and increasing U.S. aid to Pakistan facilitated a second period of stagflation in the 1990s. During this period, both Benazir Bhutto and Nawaz Sharif attempted to tackle stagflation, with Nawaz Sharif first implementing economic liberalization and privatization. The second period was ended by Shaukat Aziz's government who implemented much tougher taxation, monetary and financial development policies in the 2000s. After Aziz's reforms, the third period came about after the 2008 elections and widespread militancy in North-West Pakistan, in addition to the 2008 financial crisis. Pakistan's leading economists and financial scholars are uncertain to the causes of stagflation, and many attribute this period to several factors including the state's role in war on terror, corruption, tough monetary policies and several other factors.

Yousaf Raza Gillani, Prime Minister of Pakistan from 2008–2012, is held responsible for doing too little to improve the economic situation. The leading financial critics points out that Gillani's government carried out no major economic reforms to encourage economic development and the few policy measures and reforms were either very modest or collapsed due to opposition from his party's leadership.

== Historical analysis ==
=== First period of stagflation ===
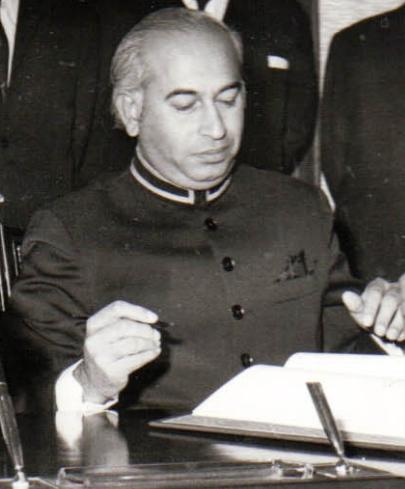
Bhutto authorised the nationalization to tackle down the stagflation with full force.

Yasmeen Niaz Mohiuddin, the author of Pakistan: A Global Studies Handbook, points out that East-Pakistan had provided employment and market of ~50% of West Pakistan's goods and materials before the 1970s. The civil war had shattered the economy; the captive markets, employments, and industrial attraction in East Pakistan was lost, and the industrial production in the country came to halt. Bhutto's government faced with many difficult problems experienced by Pakistan's economy including the low productivity combined with a high rate of monetary in circulation. As response to this, Bhutto devalued the national currency and announced the new labour policy at an instance. The first attempt was to establish a command and control economy to revitalize the stagnant economy and introduced the nationalization programme which nationalized entire private industrial corporations under government-ownership management which was devolved into a substantial state-sector. Bhutto cancelled the planned economic system and focused on intensifying government control of private business industries. Zulfikar Ali Bhutto's government replaced economic planning and institutionalized competence by appointing highly qualified personnel who took an ad hoc approach to planning the new economic system. The recommendations of the Planning Commission were bypassed and economic planning became more politicized after 1974.

The Nationalization programme brought a bad juncture and severe the reputation of Pakistan Peoples Party. The heavy mechanical industries were insufficiently overstaffed and failed to produce the effective productivity, with accumulated loss of ₨.254 million. According to the studies of Mohiuddin, the mechanical and machine building industries had employed surplus workers by PPP for various political reasons, which led the sharp decrease in productivity and increase in dead weight losses. However, not everything was stagflated, some industrial corporation, particularly in cement, petroleum, and fertilizers made profits, others endured with heavy losses. By the end of 1977, Bhutto's economic policy measure programme produced an inevitable huge losses; high budget deficits; high unemployment and fall of GDP growth rate; and an excess of high government expenditures over revenues and inflation.

Bhutto had won the popularity on economic and social justice, but studies shows that income distribution had worsened under his government. Mohiuddin pointed out that the Gini coefficient was increased by nearly ~22.0% in rural areas and ~10.0% in urban areas. The Gini coefficient was increased from 0.231 in 1972 to ~0.263—0.355 in 1979-80 in the country. The inflation and unemployment increased to 16.0% in the 1970s in contrast to 5.0% in the 1960s. The controversial and poorly studied financial policies and political resentment led the dismissal of Zulfikar Ali Bhutto in 1977 and was subsequent executed in 1979.

=== Second period of stagflation ===
Periods	GDP Growth Rate↓ (according to Sartaj Aziz)	Inflation Rate↑ (according to Sartaj Aziz)
1988-89	4.88%	10.39%
1989-90	4.67%	6.04%
1991-92	7.68%	9.62%
1992-93	3.03%	11.66%
1993-94	4.0%	11.80%
1994-95	4.5%	14.5%
1995-96	1.70%	10.79%

As an aftermath of the 1990 general elections, the right-wing conservatives under the leadership of Nawaz Sharif came to the power for the first time in the history of Pakistan. Nawaz Sharif strike the stagflation with full force after forcefully implementing the privatization and economic liberalization programmes. The stagflation was temporarily ended in the country. However, Sharif's programmes were widely criticized by Pakistan Peoples Party in state media and the growth did not contain the sustainability. The privatization programme under the economic liberalisation programme came with largely surrounded controversies and reckless by Nawaz Sharif to implement his programme. According to the Pakistan Peoples Party, Nawaz Sharif's government arbitrarily fixing the reference prices of the (privatized) state units and ignoring those suggested by the evaluations; though, Sartaj Aziz strongly dismissed the claims.

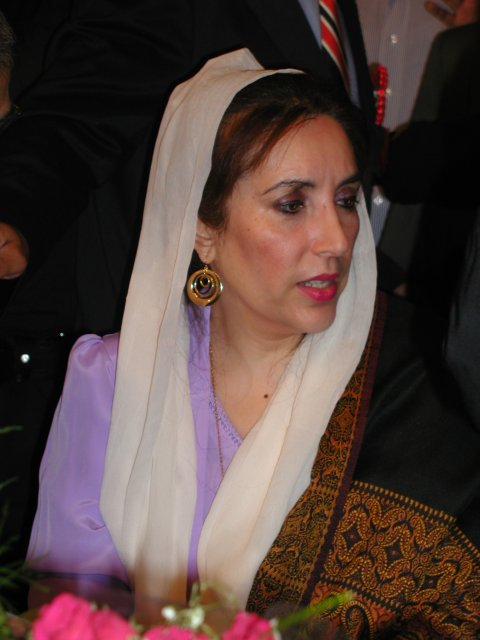
Benazir Bhutto was presiding the country (as Prime Minister) during the peak times of second period of stagflation.

In an article, "The curse of stagflation", Aziz posthumously blamed the second government of Pakistan Peoples Party, and pointed out the failure of the planned economic system of Benazir Bhutto. In the Eighth Plan, Benazir Bhutto, assisted by her financial advisers at the Finance ministry set target to achieve 6.9% for the GDP growth by 1995, but eventually the GDP Growth rate lowered to 5.3% and ended up at 4.30%. The stagflation generally affected the industrial growth target which was aimed to achieve 7%, but "suffered a serious shortfall in its productivity and instead the industrial growth ends up at the 5.0%, with many industrial firms and factories were forced to closed down, adding to the ranks of the unemployed." The country's stock markets saw the sharpest fall in the history of the country, and its value of shares falls to 40.0%, with total loss of ₨.170 billion to national and foreign investors. Constant economic pressure and failure of the planned economy led the dismissal from power of Benazir Bhutto in 1996 when she failed to materialize her and the relatively poor economic growth. By the 1996, the economic GDP growth had reached to 1.70% (lowest growth since 1970) and the rate of inflation had risen to 10.79% (highest since 1991).

After returning to power with heavy margins, Nawaz Sharif made several attempts to end the stagflation in the country. Overall, the conditions had been worsened and a year after being elected, Sharif ordered the nuclear tests in a response to India's nuclear aggression. Despite the 1997 Asian financial crisis and the 1998 Russian financial crisis, and amid economic sanctions after nuclear tests, the foreign exchange increased to $1.5 billion, the stock market improved and inflation was contained at 3.5% as opposed to 7% in 1993-96. Sharif's second government restored the GDP growth to 3.49% in 1997, tough inflation remains high at 11.80%. Little progress was made by Sharif in 1998, and his reforms only leveled up the GDP growth to 4.19%, while retaining the inflation and unemployment at 7.8%.

However, Sharif's reform suffered a major set back in 1999 when the country began militarily involved with India in two occasions, which led the dismissal of his government in 1999. By the time Sharif was dismissed the GDP remains at ~3.19%, though the unemployment and inflation rate decreases down to 2%, and was at 5.74%.

== Reassessment and development ==
=== Policies and enforcement ===
In 1999, Sharif was dismissed in a military coup d'état led by chairman joint chiefs general Pervez Musharraf and without wasting any time, the new military government brought a role of Shaukat Aziz. At the very beginning the economic slowdown and crises was acknowledge by the new government and Musharraf installed another system known as "Broad-based strategy." The military government wanted a quick economic turnaround and for that purpose, Aziz was brought up to national politics. The planned economic system was disbanded by Aziz and replaced with a new system known as "Medium Term Development Framework" in 1999.

There was a ~70% declining in the national economy with the loss of $150 million (1999) to $600 million (2000), which constituted 0.21% of FDI global flow. Aziz took initiatives for Foreign direct investment (FDI) offering incentives to foreign investors with his macroeconomic policies, taxation framework and a consistent investment policy. The implementation and enforcement of economic liberalisation and privatization programmes led the boom the economy, which subsequently ended the stagflation era, and for the first time since 1984, the GDP growth had reached to 9.0%— one of the highest in the world.

== Economic decay and responsive measures ==
=== Third era of stagflation ===
The high fall in currency value in contrast to the US dollar, indicating the high rise in stagflation.

The economic performance and growth dramatically decayed after the 2008 general elections and the wide spread militancy in Western Pakistan. President Pervez Musharraf was forced to step down by a collective leadership led by Yousaf Raza Gillani and Asfandiar Vali. To counter Musharraf's legitimacy, Gillani and his collective leadership developed the idea to uplift suspension and restore the Justice Iftikhar Chaudhry as country's chief justice. Musharraf's dismissal led the establishment of more socialist and leftist (although nationalist as well) (soviet oriented) collective leadership-style government; the share of the government was distributed in among the leadership of MQM, ANP, JUI and PML(Q). The new politically dominated collective leadership government led by Prime minister Yousaf Raza Gillani had first struggle to appoint capable finance ministers, and dramatically ousted two Finance ministers of the country. Temporarily, the charge of restoration of the national economy was given to Hina Rabbani Khar who made partial success on presenting the federal budget. During the 2008 financial crisis, growth in Pakistan halted the abruptly and stalled for a longer period than any other states in the South Asia, causing the economy first becoming stagnant. Under the presiding rule of Gillani, the state currency value of the Rupee (₨.) crashed from 60-1 USD to 80-1 USD in only a month, the prices of commodities soared through the roof, the number of people living below poverty line increased from 60 million to 77 million. The country's working class (which dominated the population of the country) became virtually deprived from basic necessities and natural resources, notably the food, water and electricity.

Fiscal year	GDP Growth Rate (according to Pakistaniaat)	Stagflation Growth Rate (according to Pakistaniaat)
2006-07	6.8%	7.8%
2007-08	3.7%	12.0%
2008-09	1.7%	20.0%
2009-10	3.8%	11.7%
2010-11	2.4%	14.5%

According to the Gulf News, the stagflation hit the poor and working class very hard, the key voter of the ruling party, Pakistan Peoples Party. The nationwide floods wiped out the 20% of the economic infrastructure in the country and the economic development initiated by private sector was curbed to ~2.5%, resulting the billion dollar worth of loss of private sector. In a less intensified nationalization programme, there was a massive hiring of unskilled and less-trained working class labour, on a political basis, which slowed down the technological productivity and halted the overall social, political, economical growth. Experts views this problem as this problem also reduced the Gillani's government ability to earn adequate revenues foreign exchange, keeping fiscal and external balances perpetually under pressure.

According to Pakistaniaat, the inflation rate of prices of goods and services in an economy rise over a period of time. This is due to economic mismanagement of highest order, notably at the government which was presided by Gillani. The Shaukat Aziz era, which had begun with high growth, inherited the government to Yousaf Raza Gillani, began to stagnant and stagflated in 2008. In 2012, just months before being ousted by Supreme Court, Gillani presented the last of five federal budget which Gillani admitted the country's economy was facing the period of stagflation. The fifth budget is an attempt to counter the stagflation by enhancing the salaries of the government and party officials and members; but the rising inflation has already eroded the incomes more than they are likely to get. The experts believed that the government is not in any position to give any relief to the masses, as the government is s facing multifaceted crisis.

=== Reasoning and causes ===
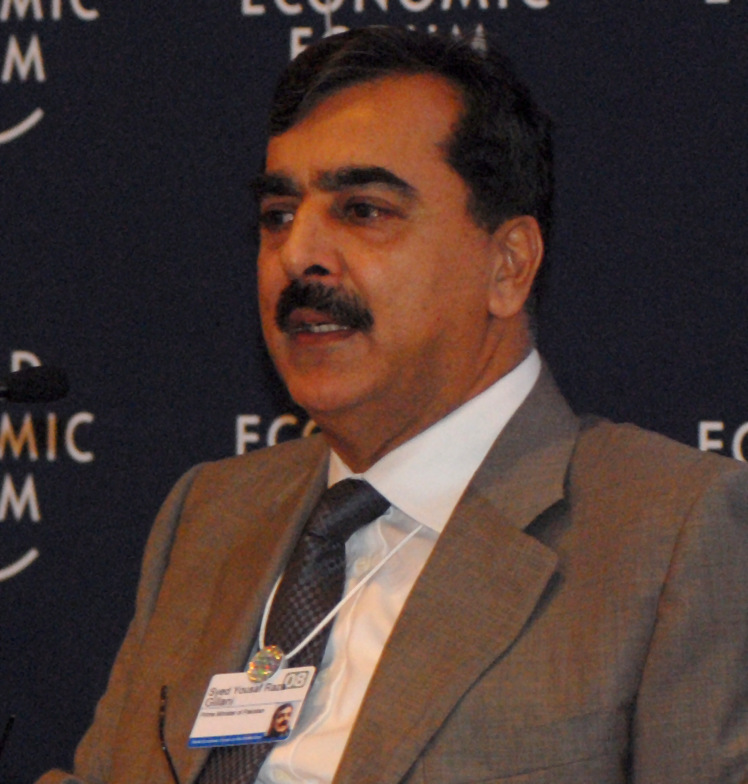
The third era of stagflation began under the rule of Yousaf Raza Gillani.

Reasoning with the stagflation, the Pakistan Today wrote that the Gilani's government "had upset the balance between the private and public sector, when the government resorts to massive employment in the public sector on political basis, badly affecting its profitability." The Pakistan Today reasoned that more than ~48% unskilled and blue collar workers were absorbed in the private-sector industries after the government-management ownership which was engaged in agriculture; thus resulted in a decline of productivity and labour discipline. Though, the specialists and economists remains unclear what key factor causes the stagflation, the many multiple factors can be attributed; on the other hand, the key media political specialists and economics writers, including the independent and neutral organization, such as Transparency International, posthumously blamed Yousaf Raza Gillani for doing too little to improve the economic situation. Throughout his democratic rule, no major reforms were initiated and the corruption, tax evasion, and the bad governance are likely to be modest factors to cause the stagflation. In 2012, the Pakistan Institute of Development Economics (PIDE) vice-chairman Dr. Rashid Amjad claims that, "the fiscal and financial constraints are hampering the capacity for investment and growth and the Finance ministry are reluctant to support rapid development of deeper debt markets." Ahmad further endorsed and maintained that, "a major cause of continuing stagflation in Pakistan was lack of Gilani's policy coordination between fiscal and monetary authorities."

One factor may involved in the stagflation is attributed to the mathematical calculation performed by PIDE, that points out that the "nation's currency in circulation as a percentage of total deposits is 31%, which is very high as compared to neighboring India". Under Gillani's presiding of the country, nearly ~40.0% of the population fell under the line of poverty, with 16.0% rise in the inflation during his four years of presiding over the country. The new strict and tight monetary policy could not tame the soaring inflation, it did stagnate the economic growth. One economist maintained that stagflation took place when the tight monetary policy did not encourage the strong private sector to play a key part in growth. Analyzing the stagflation problem, the PIDE observed that a major cause of continuous era of stagflation in Pakistan was lack of coordination between fiscal and monetary authorities.

== See also ==
- Benazir Bhutto
- History of Pakistan since 1971
- Post–World War II economic expansion
