= Economic liberalisation in Pakistan =

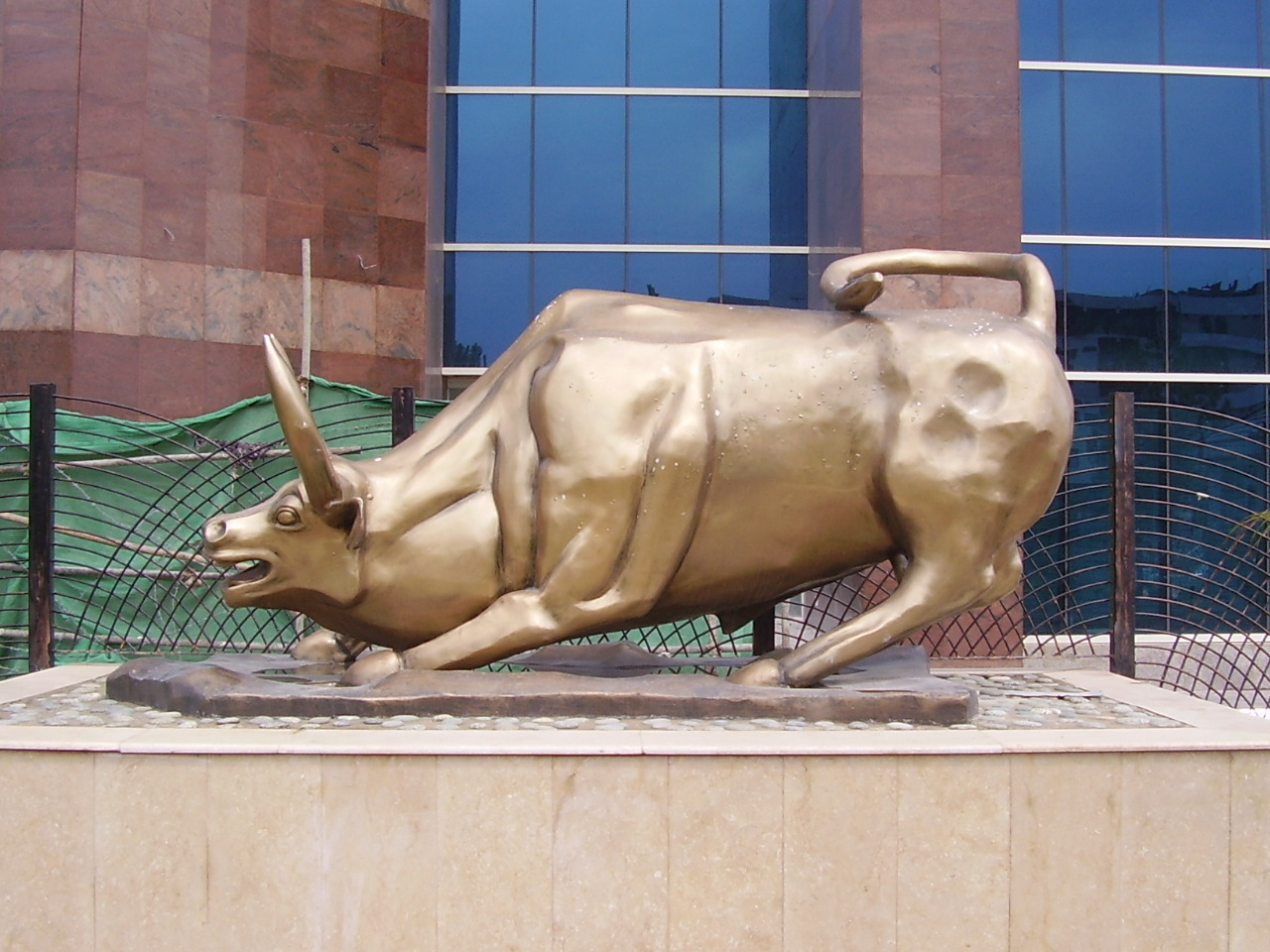
The golden bull of the PSX symbolises the success of the economic liberalisation in Pakistan.

Pakistan began a period of economic liberalisation in the 1990s to promote and accelerate economic independence, development, and GDP growth.

This policy programme was first conceived in early 1980s and thoroughly studied by the ministry of finance led by finance ministers Ghulam Ishaq Khan and Mahbub-ul-Haq and was implemented first by Pakistan Muslim League and the Prime minister Nawaz Sharif, as part of the privatisation programme in 1990. The programme of economic liberalisation, as one of the counter-policy measure programme, came in a direct response to nationalization programme of Pakistan Peoples Party (PPP) in the 1970s. After the 1993 general elections, the programme was halted and reversed by Prime minister Benazir Bhutto and the Peoples Party after the Pressler amendment went into complete effect and force, that led the economic and financial crises in Pakistan. A much powerful socialist capitalism version was adopted in order to secure the revenue and financial capital of existing state-owned enterprises, with enforcement of nationalisation and privatisation at once. Second attempt was again attempted by the Pakistan Muslim League and Prime minister Nawaz Sharif after securing exclusive mandate during the 1997 general elections, however abruptly terminated the programme after weapon-test performances in Chagai weapons-testing laboratories in 1998 (See Chagai-I and Chagai-II) and the Kargil debacle in 1999.

In 2000, then-Finance Minister and later Prime Minister Shaukat Aziz conducted comprehensive studies after assuming charge of the national economy following the 1999 coup d'état. The fruits of liberalisation reached their peak in 2003–04 when Pakistan recorded its highest national GDP growth to 8.96%~9.9%. In 2008–10, Pakistan is ranked 47th largest in the world in nominal terms and 27th largest in the world in terms of purchasing power parity (PPP).

== Exclusive liberalism ==
The liberalisation methods raised country's GDP growth at 9.38% (1964), 8.71% (1980s) and 8.97% (2004–07).

After exclusive establishment of Pakistan, the country's economic policy for the rapid growth of the national economy was deeply understood and extensive efforts were carried out by the government of Prime minister Liaquat Ali Khan in 1947. Since 1947, economic officials of government have sought a high rate of economic growth in an effort to lift the population out of poverty, first viewing rapid heavy industrialization and strong and powerful Private-sector as necessity and quick economic solution. At the partition in 1947, Ali Khan's government lacked qualified technical personnel, financial institutions, and natural resources to play a large role in developing the economy. Policies were goaded in the road of liberalism and state intervention at once to promote the national growth. The Five-Year Plans of Pakistan resembled planned and central planning exclusively restricted for the military contracts, power and energy sector, and manufacture and operation of railroad network, telephone, telegraph, and wireless equipment. The rest of the sectors were left for the private-sector ownership management.

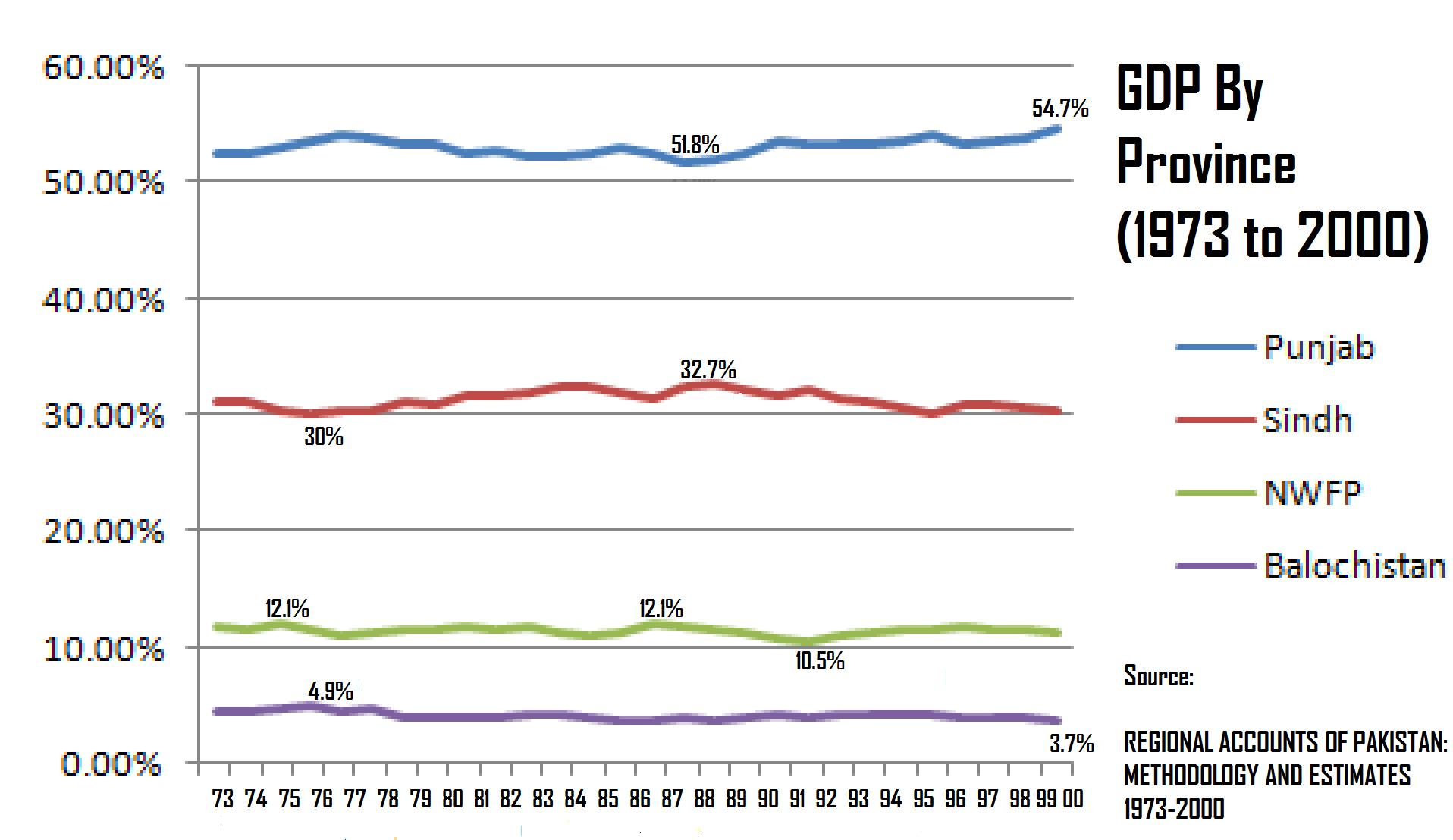
The GDP growth in each provinces of Pakistan, for instance, Punjab had higher GDP growth were majority of economic liberalisation took place in 1980–99.

However, the efforts to liberalise the economy waned due to amid social and political unrest which led to the first martial law in the country. President Ayub Khan took many initiatives for liberalising the economy and successfully supervised the promulgation of the 1962 Constitution that introduced extreme level of economic liberalisation of the economy. Widely appreciated and backed by the United States to liberalise the economy, the reforms on the other hand, came with controversies and popular rejections by the civil society. In public circles, the considerable debate about the inequitable distribution of income, wealth, and economic power began to take place at national level. Studies by economists from government institutions in the 1960s indicated that the forty big industrial oligarch groups have had owned around 42% of the nation's industrial assets and more than 50% of private domestic assets. Eight of the nine major commercial banks were also controlled by these same industrial groups. Concern over the concentration of wealth was dramatically articulated in a 1968 speech by dr. Mahbub-ul-Haq, the chief economist of the Planning Commission. Dr. Haq and the officials at planning commission claimed that Pakistan's national economic growth had done little to improve the standard of living of the common person and that the "trickle-down approach to development" had only concentrated wealth in the hands of "twenty-two industrial families." The Planning Commission argued that the government needed to intervene in the economy to correct the natural tendency of free markets to concentrate wealth in the hands of those who already possessed substantial assets.

== Era of economic progressiveness ==
After the 1971 war, Bhutto launched a much serious policy measure programme in 1971, called nationalization programme. Under this programme, all major liberalised industries came under intense government-ownership management where majority of industries were vertically integrated. Under limited five-year of his government, the public and government sector expanded greatly, and government investment grew each and every year to boost the function of the industries. An extreme level of left-wing but nationalist economics reforms were introduced by Bhutto to raise the economic revenue of the government sector while curbing down the liberalise private-sector.

== Reforms and Islamization ==
In 1977, the government of Pakistan People's Party (PPP) was ousted in a coup d'état under codename, Fair Play. Immediately, a new programme of reforms were introduced in order to secure the private-sector from being diminished in the country's economical platform. There were two cornerstones of President Zia-ul-Haq's economic policy, including liberalisation and Islamisation of the economy. The government employed and adopted many recommendation policy studies by professionals, engineers, and economists to meet the goals of economic reforms. The new policy relied upon building private-sector and enterprises to achieve economic goals. Although, the new policy focused on liberalisation of economy but it fell under the Islamization programme, and forcefully reversed the nationalisation programme.

Several industries were privatised but not banks that were kept under government-ownership management. Under a new policy, the private-sector investment grew from ~33% in 1980 to ~44% in 1989. A new system was also formed in 1979, which marked the Islamization of the economy. The new Islamize ordinances were promulgated which also absorbed the liberalisation of the economy under a new economic system.

== Persuasive economic liberalisation ==
PKR per US dollar 1995–2008 Periods of Stagflation: the inflation increased as US Dollar gained currency during the times of liberalisation.
Year	Highest ↑		Lowest ↓	
Year	Date	Rate	Date	Rate
1996		PKR 30.93		
1997				PKR 35.27
1998		PKR 40.19		
1999		PKR 44.55		
2000		PKR 51.90		
2001		PKR 53.65		
2002		PKR 61.93		
2003		PKR 59.72		
2005		PKR 57.75		
2006		PKR 58.00		
2009	5 Aug	PKR 60.75	1 Nov	PKR 60.50
2010	10 October	PKR 80.00	1 Apr	PKR 63.50
Source: PKR exchange rates in USD, SBP

As an aftermath of 1990 general elections, the conservatives for the first in the history of the country came to power under a democratic system. This right-wing alliance, Islamic Democratic Alliance (IDA), was led by Nawaz Sharif who was also country's elected Prime minister. Major ground base was built in order to liberalize the economy and soon after his election, an intense privatisation and liberalisation programme was started in 1990. From the statements issued by Sharif, both publicly and privately, the privatisation and liberalisation programmes were the pillars of Sharif's economic policies. Nawaz Sharif aggressively forwarded towards the privatisation, deregulation and liberalisation of private sector in a vision to "turning Pakistan into a Korea by encouraging greater private saving and investment to accelerate economic growth". Prime Minister Sharif's economics team actually implemented some of the serious economic liberalisation and privatisation measures that previous governments merely talked about. Many of the members of previous regimes now are seen arguing vociferously from the unfortunate position of, "we were going to do that too".

The liberalisation of economy was intended to end the government subsidiaries and to reduce the role of the government in national economy. Successful attempts were carried out by Sharif to expand the role of the private sector, and to redress the imbalances in social services. From 1990 to 1993, the private and foreign investments were greatly relaxed. This was followed by the liberalisation of the foreign exchange which was readily free, and at the same time, the interest rates were substantially liberalised, credit subsidies were cut, and energy prices were moved much closer to costs. The economic liberalisation and structural reform measures were necessary and had been overdue at that time. However, instead of being pursued with even greater vigor and effectiveness, the liberalisation programme could not substitute for adequate stabilization efforts and macroeconomic stability. By the end of 1993 which was the year of ousting the government of Nawaz Sharif, the benefits from economic liberalisation were seriously limited in the absence of reduction of effective macroeconomic policies. As it grappled with the ongoing foreign exchange crisis in early 1993–97, Pakistan's most urgent economic need was to raise both national savings and exports.

== Era of economic stagflation ==
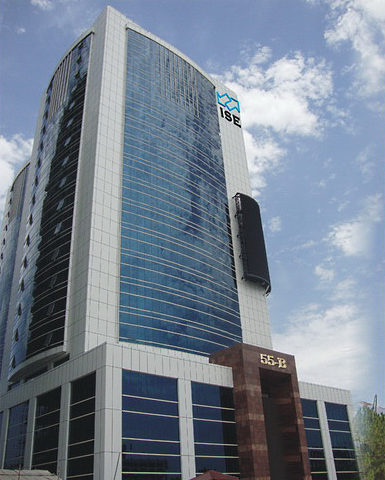
The economic liberalism opens new stock exchanges offices in the country, the one illustrated.

The United States based Pressler amendment and the Asian financial crisis severed the economic conditions in Pakistan. The growth of the economy relatively slowed down in the year 1993–97, the country failed to attract the foreign investors to boost the economy. Responding to the crises, Benazir Bhutto tightened the control of megacorporations while on the other hand, continued the privatisation of mediocre industries to private-sector. From the period 1994–96, the level of corruption heightened and the charges against Benazir Bhutto gained currency. In midst of 1993, Benazir Bhutto embarked an ambitious medium term programme, Eighth Five-Year Plans, that was aimed to adjust the macroeconomics principles to alleviate the national economy. But, it had produced the short-lived outcomes and in 1994–95, the country had performed the economic results below its potential. Major concessions were made in taxation and monetary policies and the annual budget clearly confirmed the pause in the process of adjustment and reform, eliciting an adverse market reaction. This policy participated in sharp rise in unemployment and rapid deterioration in the external reserves position, bringing the country back to the brink of a foreign exchange crisis in October 1995. In 1996–97, Pakistan have ranked and regarded as "highly in-debt developing country" by the international financial organisations.

This led the dismissal of Benazir Bhutto's government, and the return of Nawaz Sharif with an exclusive mandate in the 1997 general elections. Sharif again put forward the aggressive privatisation and liberalisation programme, starting first with new monetary and taxation policies. At government level, the private-sector was given much support and the public sector was declined under Sharif's new economic policy. Sharif's government liberalise the exchange rate policy and residents and nonresidents in the country were allowed the open foreign currency accounts with banks and NBFIs. However, such policies were short-lived when Pakistan under the leadership of Nawaz Sharif, ordered to perform nuclear tests in a direct response to Indian nuclear aggression, which led the imposition of UN embargo on both states.

== Attainability of capital liberalisation ==
After the 1999 coup d'état, the new civic-military government brought the role of Shaukat Aziz as appointed Finance minister, who was destined to become country's successful technocratic Prime minister in 2004–07. The new economic liberalisation efforts began in 2000 after a year of careful studies. A powerful and aggressive liberalisation programme was launched with major state-owned enterprises (SOEs), banks, and other industries were put in private-sector ownership management. Particularly after 2001, the country went rapid rise in economic development and its GDP rate heightened first time in 1992. Shaukat Aziz aggressively implemented economic liberalisation policies despite labor union's resentments and reserves. For the first time 1980s, the GDP growth rate reached to 9.0%, one of the highest growth rate in the world.

== Period of stagflation and general impact in South Asia ==
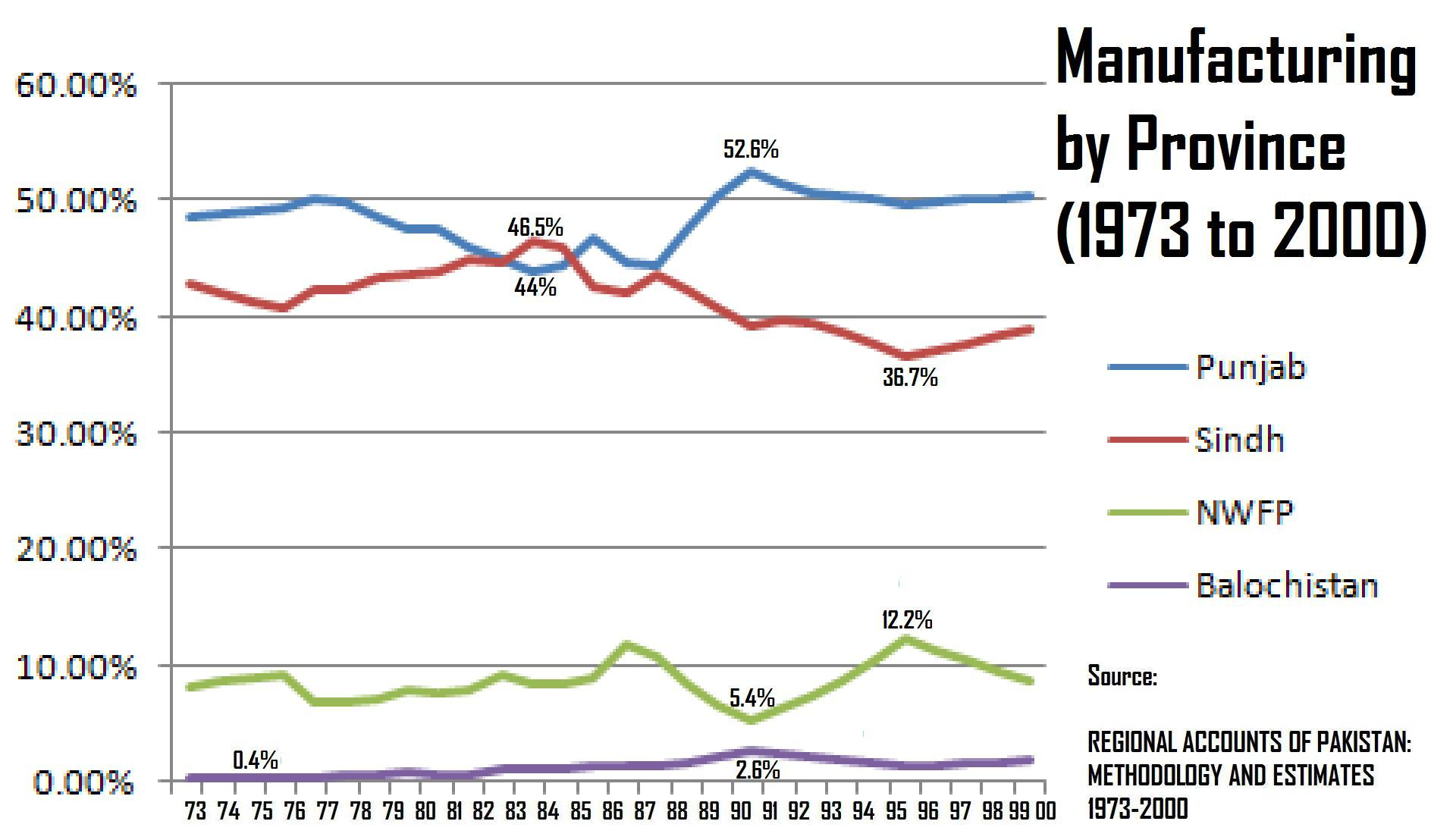
The productivity and quality assurance increased but on the other hand, inflation took a sharp rise.

Although the economic liberalisation process in the country took off with great ground success, but in the 1990s, the targets were not successfully achieved because of the certain monetary obstacles and financial anomalies, despite the great expectation of Prime minister Nawaz Sharif. Ironically, the economic liberalisation had a reversed effect on Pakistan's economic development unlike neighboring India who started the economic liberalisation later than a year in Pakistan. In 1980–89, the economic reforms gained momentum and hard efforts were put to liberalise the economy before the Fall of communism in the Soviet Union, as country had realized long ago. Pakistan's economic liberalisation reforms and policies were followed by India, Sri Lanka, Bangladesh, and Nepal, however, in all of these countries, the index of imports and economical GDP growth rates increased, except Pakistan where its economic rates underwent either stagnation or stagflation. As compared to Indian economic liberalisation where growth rate of employment increased, on the other hand, Pakistan's growth rate dramatically fell, though it did reached the level of negative percentage. Traditionally and in the universal terminology, the economic liberalisation reforms are viewed as to grow and promote the GDP growth (such as India's GDP), the economic liberalisation had halted Pakistan's GDP growth. The liberalisation reforms in 1990s entered Pakistan's economy into the "Era of Stagflation" where the unemployment and inflation took sharp rise but other hand, the productivity and the quality assurance of products increased. The Era of Stagflation hit poor and working class very hard and the inflation kept to rise despite many initiatives were taken by the successive governments. Pakistan's economist and financial specialists are uncertain what caused the stagflation in the first place with some arguing that the planned economy of Prime minister Benazir Bhutto was doomed to failure from the very beginning, while others remained that there was a lack of coordination between fiscal and monetary authorities in a policies directed by Nawaz Sharif.

== See also ==
- Five-Year Plans of Pakistan – economic planning for the planned national economy of Pakistan under Benazir Bhutto
