= Medium Term Development Framework =

Policy measure programme of the Government of Pakistan

The Medium Term Development Framework (Urdu: قالبِ وسط مدّتی برائے ترقیات) (denoted as MTDF) is a policy measure programme of the Government of Pakistan drafted by the Ministry of Finance, Economic Coordination Committee and the Planning Commission of Pakistan, formulated to strengthen the national economy and civil infrastructure.

Drafted and launched by then Prime Minister Shaukat Aziz in 2005, the programme was envisioned to turn the country into a major industrialized nation, to increase the speed of human development and sustain a new economic system aimed at reducing poverty and achieving Millennium Development Goals (MDGs). The programme replaced the existing, centralized economic system of Pakistan, known as Five-Year Plans which had been in effect since 1955. The programme emphasized principles of macroeconomics connected with the development of scientific technology and human resources, while guiding the formulation of policies in areas such as education, labor, trade, science and technology, taxation and financial management.

The first set of plans were approved by Shaukat Aziz in 2005-10 and incorporated a shift towards the competitiveness through higher private-sector investment and to improve total factor productivity.

The programme can be traced back to early 2001, when the economic coordination committee working under Aziz began to research the development of a ten-year programme and adopted the concept of three-year rolling plans. The recommendations were prepared in the background of various economic sanctions imposed on Pakistan in 1998, until the economy began to recover in 2001. Finally, on June 1, 2004, the programme became part of official policy on March 5, 2005.
