= Five-Year Plans of Pakistan =

Pakistani national program for economic development

The Five-Year Plans for the National Economy of Pakistan (Urdu: اقتصادی منصوبہ جاتِ پنج سالہ ، پاکستان) (otherwise publicly known as Five-Year Economic Plans for the National Economy), were the series of nationwide centralised economic plans and targets as part of the economic development initiatives, in the Pakistan. The plan was conceived by the Ministry of Finance (MoF), and were studied and developed by the Economic Coordination Committee (ECC) based on the theory of Cost-of-production value, and also covered the areas of Trickle-down system. Supervision and fulfillment of this programme became the watchword of Pakistan's civil bureaucracy since early 1950s.

Inspired by the five-year plans of the Soviet Union, the programme was envisioned and proposed by the first Finance Minister Malik Ghulam Mohammad to Prime minister Liaquat Ali Khan who initially backed the programme, in 1948. The first five-year plans were approved by the prime minister Ali Khan in 1950 for the period of 1950–55; it was accepted in a view to serve in the rapid and intensified industrialisation, expansion of banking and financial services, with a major focus on heavy industry. Although the five-year plans did not take up the full period of time assigned to them, some of the plans failed and were abandoned whilst some were completed successfully. Altogether, there were eight five-year plans (starting 1950 till 1999) and were replaced with the more effective Medium Term Development Framework (MTDF) programme under Prime Minister Shaukat Aziz (office: 2004–2007).

== History ==
=== First Five-Year Plans (1955-1960) ===
Although Pakistan didn't officially launch a First Five-Year Plan, it embarked on various development initiatives during this period. The key focus areas included agriculture, industries, and infrastructure development. At the time of partition of British India by the United Kingdom, Pakistan was a relatively under-developed country. The country's systems of production, transportation, trade and consumption yielded a very low standard of living, with little opportunity for education, or economic advancement in the country. The industries and financial services were non-existent in the country and agriculture development was among the lowest in the world. The vast majority of the population still lived in villages and was untouched by the scientific and technological development of the past two centuries. The partition had a major effect on the country's existing economic infrastructure that disrupted the wholesale transfers of population, trade and business, channels of communication, industrial and commercial organisation, and the pressing need to establish new provisional governments. Economic planning began in 1948 when Prime Minister Liaquat Ali Khan presented the first Five-Year plans at the parliament of Pakistan on 8 July 1948. The first plan was conceived by the Ministry of Finance (MoF), and were studied and developed by the Economic Coordination Committee (ECC) based on the theory of Cost-of-production value, and also covered trickle-down economics. As part of this programme, the State Bank of Pakistan was established to give a kickstart to banking services in the country. The major economic infrastructure was quickly expanded and the hiring gap was filled as government revenue began to rise. The currency war with India following the devaluation of the British Pound Sterling and Indian refusal to recognize the Pakistani rupee in 1949 led to a deadlock in India-Pakistan trade.

In the middle of 1950, relations were restored when India and Pakistan resumed trade, and in February 1951, India formally recognized Pakistan's currency after entering in a new trade agreement, but older trade relations were not restored. The Korean War brought about an economic boom but growth declined after the assassination of Liaquat Ali Khan in October 1951. Moreover, efforts to continue the programme failed, partly due to inadequate staff officers and lack of ambitions. In 1953, the programme collapsed when shortages of clothes, medicines and other essential consumer goods arose; there was also a serious food shortage as a result of monsoon floods after 1951. Prime Minister Khawaja Nazimuddin was forced to end the programme after requesting economic assistance from the United States and other friendly countries.

==== Reassessment and collectivisation ====
New studies were conducted in 1955 after the collapse of the first programme. According to the census, over 90% of the population lived in rural areas while only 10% lived in urban areas. In East Pakistan, the urban proportion was as low as 4.0% compared to 18.1% in West Pakistan, although the urbanisation had been increased at an accelerated level. In 1955, Prime Minister Muhammad Ali Bogra again revived the plan and published it in 1956. After reassessment, the programme was launched again with agricultural development as the highest priority, and strong emphasis placed on rapidly increasing developmental efforts in East Pakistan and in the less-developed areas of West Pakistan. Prime Minister Huseyn Suhrawardy of the Awami League gave much priority to food development, agriculture and social development in both states. The concept of Collective farming was introduced by Suhrawardy as part of his agricultural policies and around 27.0 million rupees were spent in order to organised the agricultural in the country. However, this programme was built entirely in the absence of much essential information and basic statistics.

In practice, this plan was not implemented because of its enormous size. The shortage of technical knowledge also devastated the programme. The Awami League's government also had shortage of foreign exchange to execute the plan, and was unable to find outside assistance to fulfill its commitment to the first five-year plans.

=== Second Five-Year Plans (1960–1965) ===
Despite the failure of the first five-year plans, the programmes were revived and restated by the military government of President Ayub Khan. The second five-year plans gave highest priority to heavy industrial development, and advancement in literature and science, and had a single underlying purpose: "to advance the country as far as possible, within the next five years, along the road of these long-range objectives.". Further improvements were made in railways, communications, and transportation. More attention was given to private sector industrial development and agricultural industries; the second five-year plans aimed to increase the national income by 20%. The unemployment was tackled with the industrialisation of the country, and overall major industrial development was carried out in West Pakistan while few in East. The Second Five-Year Plan surpassed its major goals when all sectors showed substantial growth which also encouraged private entrepreneurs to participate in those activities in which a great deal of profit could be made, while the government acted in those sectors of the economy where private business was reluctant to operate.

This mix of private enterprise and social responsibility was hailed as a model that other developing countries could follow. The second five-year plans oversaw the development of water and power utilities in East and West Pakistan and had energy sector built with the help from private-sector. The financial services heavily depended on the foreign investment and aid from the United States that bolstered the economy. The second five-year plans were quiet a big success but it was partially due to generous infusions of foreign aid, particularly from the United States. preference of village agro technical program of rural development so that the agro technical production methods may be improved.

=== Third Five-Year Plans (1965–1970) ===
After the 1965 Indo-Pakistani War over Kashmir, the level of foreign assistance declined and economic constraints were imposed on Pakistan. The third five-year plan was designed along the lines of its immediate predecessor, and produced only modest growth. The country had become urbanised by 1970 and only 10% population lived in rural areas as compared to 1950. The third five-year plans promoted the activities of private sector investment and tend to increase the directly productive investment for the stable Financial sector development.

The third programme focused on Gross national product (GNP) growth which was increased at 122% and had focused on the enhancing the capabilities of private sector to operate in the country. The size of the third programme was determined in the light of a careful evaluation of the recent experience under the second programme. Although the third programme successfully ran for the first three years of the Third Five-Year Plan, but at the end, the third programme proved to be even more of a disappointment in terms of proclaimed production goals. The performance of the third programme was undeniable that led the economical disaster in the country. Dramatically, the agriculture growth sharply declined and desperately devastated the farming class of the country.

=== Fourth Five-Year Plans (1970–1975) ===
The fourth five-year plans was abandoned after the fall of Dhaka East-Pakistan. Virtually all fourth five-year planning was bypassed by the government of Prime minister Zulfikar Ali Bhutto. Under Bhutto, only annual plans were prepared, and they were largely ignored.

The fourth five-year plan was replaced with the nationalisation programme which featured an intense level of government-ownership management on private entities. Only scientific aspects of fourth five-year plans were adopted in a view to turn Pakistan into a major "scientific superpower" in the world.

=== Fifth Five-Year Plans (1978–1983) ===
The Zia government accorded more importance to planning. The Fifth Five-Year Plan (1978–83) was an attempt to stabilise the economy and improve the standard of living of the poorest segment of the population. Increased defense expenditures and a flood of refugees to Pakistan after the Soviet invasion of Afghanistan in December 1979, as well as the sharp increase in international oil prices in 1979–80, drew resources away from planned investments (see Pakistan Becomes a Frontline State, ch. 5). Nevertheless, some of the plan's goals were attained. Many of the controls on industry were liberalised or abolished, the balance of payments deficit was kept under control, and Pakistan became self-sufficient in all basic foodstuffs with the exception of edible oils. Yet the plan failed to stimulate substantial private industrial investment and to raise significantly the expenditure on rural infrastructure development.

=== Sixth Five-Year Plan (1983–88) ===
The sixth five-year plans represented a significant shift toward the private sector. It was designed to tackle some of the major problems of the economy: low investment and savings ratios; low agricultural productivity; heavy reliance on imported energy; and low spending on health and education. The economy grew at the targeted average of 6.5% during the plan period and would have exceeded the target had it not been for severe droughts in 1986 and 1987.

=== Seventh Five-Year Plan (1988–93) ===
The Seven Year Plan will be introduced by Benazir Government. The seventh plans provided for total public-sector spending of Rs350 billion. Of this total, 36.5% was designated for energy, 18% for transportation and communications, 9% for water, 8% for physical infrastructure and housing, 7% for education, 5% for industry and minerals, 4% for health, and 11% for other sectors. The plan gave much greater emphasis than before to private investment in all sectors of the economy. Total planned private investment was Rs292 billion, and the private-to- public ratio of investment was expected to rise from 42:58 in FY 1988 to 48:52 in FY 1993. It was also intended that public-sector corporations finance most of their own investment programmes through profits and borrowing.

In August 1991, the government established a working group on private investment for the Eighth Five-Year Plan (1993–98).

=== Eighth Five Year Plan (1993–98) ===
This group, which included leading industrialists, presidents of chambers of commerce, and senior civil servants, submitted its report in late 1992. However, in early 1994, the eighth plan had not yet been announced, mainly because the successive changes of government in 1993 forced ministers to focus on short-term issues. Instead, economic policy for FY 1994 was being guided by an annual plan.

From June 2004, the Planning Commission gave a new name to the Five Year Plan – Medium Term Development Framework (MTDF). Thirty two Working Groups then produced the MTDF 2005–2010.

== Sources ==
- "Development Planning" (April 1994) A Country Study: Pakistan. Library of Congress.
