= United States aid to Pakistan =

The United States has been providing military aid and economic assistance to Pakistan for various purposes since 1948. In 2017, the U.S. stopped military aid to Pakistan, which was about US$2 billion per year. With U.S. military assistance suspended in 2018 and civilian aid reduced to about $300 million for 2022, Pakistani authorities have turned to other countries for help.

== History ==
From 1947 to 1958, under civilian leadership, the United States provided Pakistan with modest economic aid and limited military assistance. During this period, Pakistan became a member of the South East Asian Treaty Organization (SEATO) and the Central Treaty Organization (CENTO), after a Mutual Defence Assistance Agreement signed in May 1954, which facilitated increased levels of both economic and military aid from the U.S.

In 1958, Ayub Khan led Pakistan's first military coup, becoming Chief Martial Law Administrator (CMLA) and later President until 1969. During his tenure, the U.S. delivered substantial economic and military aid, despite Pakistan's governance by military regime, and amidst events like the Indo-Pakistani war of 1965.

Yahya Khan succeeded Ayub in 1969, holding power during the Indo-Pakistani war of 1971 which led to the secession of East Pakistan and the formation of Bangladesh. Under Yahya, the U.S. provided adequate economic but minimal military aid.

Civilian governance of Zulfikar Ali Bhutto resumed from 1971 to 1977, during which the U.S. offered modest economic support and withheld military aid as Pakistan finalized its constitution, establishing a parliamentary democracy.

Following another military coup in 1977, Muhammad Zia-ul-Haq led the country. In April 1979, President Jimmy Carter halted all aid, excluding food assistance, due to Pakistan's efforts to establish a uranium enrichment facility, following Symington Amendment. Initial U.S. aid was limited, increasing significantly after geopolitical shifts such as the Soviet invasion of Afghanistan in 1979 and the fall of the Shah of Iran. U.S. sanctions imposed in April 1979 due to Pakistan's nuclear activities were lifted by the end of the year in light of these events.

Between 1988 and 1999, under civilian and democratic governments, U.S. aid was low, particularly after the Soviet withdrawal from Afghanistan in 1989. The aid was suspended in the 1990s under President George H. W. Bush, who cited concerns over Pakistan's developing nuclear program. Relations between the two countries deteriorated as the U.S. implemented the Pressler Amendment. This amendment led to severe sanctions against Pakistan, exacerbating economic challenges for the country's nascent civilian government. Consequently, all forms of bilateral aid from the U.S. to Pakistan were halted. The once expansive operations of the U.S. Agency for International Development (USAID) in Pakistan, which had employed over 1,000 staff across the country, were dramatically reduced almost overnight. Further complications arose from U.S. sanctions following Pakistan's nuclear tests in 1998, which were conducted in response to similar tests by India.

The return of military rule under Pervez Musharraf from 1999 to 2008 initially saw little U.S. economic or military aid. However, following the September 11, 2001 attacks, all U.S. sanctions were removed, and Pakistan, having aligned with the U.S. in the war on terror, received substantial increases in both economic and military assistance.

On June 16, 2009, the U.S. Senate Foreign Relations Committee passed the Enhanced Partnership with Pakistan Act of 2009, commonly referred to as the Kerry-Lugar Bill. The bipartisan act authorized an annual provision of $1.5 billion in U.S. aid to Pakistan, aimed at fostering enhanced bilateral relations.

In 2011, the Obama administration suspended more than one-third of all military assistance, totaling approximately $800 million due to Osama bin Laden-related controversy. This reduction encompassed funds designated for military hardware and reimbursements for specific Pakistani security expenses, including $300 million allocated for counterinsurgency efforts.

In August 2017, the Trump administration informed Congress that it was placing $255 million in military assistance to Pakistan into an escrow account. Access to these funds by Islamabad would be contingent upon Pakistan taking stronger action against terror networks within its borders that were conducting attacks in neighboring Afghanistan. As the United States canceled all military aid to Pakistan in the 2010s, Pakistan increasingly turned to military cooperation with China.

== Past Military aid ==
In the 1950s and 1960s, the U.S. provided Pakistan with development assistance complemented by military support, including armaments and training. This assistance was suspended in 1965 but resumed following the Soviet invasion of Afghanistan in 1979. During this period, Pakistan became a frontline ally, facilitating support to the mujahideen combating the Soviet forces. Substantial amounts of aid were directed through Pakistan, though reports indicate that portions of these funds were diverted by elements within Pakistan's military.

The Pakistani military indirectly received U.S. aid during the Afghan war, with official funds designated for refugee rehabilitation and infrastructure development. This infrastructure was intended to improve logistical access to Afghanistan and arguably served as compensation for Pakistan's participation in the conflict.

After aligning with the U.S. in the war on terror in 2001, Pakistan was encouraged to enhance its counterterrorism operations. The Coalition Support Fund (CSF) was established to cover the additional costs incurred by Pakistan above regular military expenditures. About 60 percent of U.S. financial aid to Pakistan during this period was allocated through the CSF.

During the 2000s, the Bush administration requested substantial funds from Congress to reimburse Pakistan and other nations for their logistical and operational support in U.S.-led counterterrorism efforts. According to former Secretary of Defense Robert Gates, CSF payments supported numerous Pakistani military operations and helped maintain a large number of Pakistani troops, also compensating for the coalition's use of Pakistani military infrastructure.

In 2009, the U.S. introduced the Pakistan Counter-Insurgency Fund (PCF) and Pakistan Counter-Insurgency Capability Fund (PCCF), aimed at supporting Pakistan's efforts to combat internal insurgencies, such as the military operation in Swat. These funds were designed with objectives similar to the CSF but focused more on addressing insurgency within Pakistan.

== Aid by year ==
Year	Economic Assistance, Total	Economic Assistance (through USAID)	Military Assistance, Total	Coalition Support Funds
1948	0.8	0	0	
1949	0	0	0	
1950	0	0	0	
1951	2.9	0	0	
1952	74.3	73.6	0	
1953	748.3	286.2	0	
1954	157.0	152.2	0	
1955	733.2	477.2	266.0	
1956	1065.7	700.9	1086.5	
1957	1079.7	619.9	437.6	
1958	968.2	589.6	533.1	
1959	1367.9	985.3	366.8	
1960	1689.8	1181.4	230.4	
1961	989.5	780.0	260.5	
1962	2334.7	1446.3	549.0	
1963	2066.8	1063.7	292.3	
1964	2222.7	1334.2	187.6	
1965	1928.9	1041.6	77.4	
1966	816.3	691.3	8.4	
1967	1213.4	719.4	26.3	
1968	1501.7	672.5	26.0	
1969	541.8	504.3	0.5	
1970	968.3	570.9	0.9	
1971	474.3	31.2	0.7	
1972	692.9	261.9	0.4	
1973	715.4	387.6	1.2	
1974	382.0	219.1	1.0	
1975	614.3	326.0	0.9	
1976	644.1	336.8	1.9	
1977	319.2	209.4	0.9	
1978	214.9	55.5	1.5	
1979	128.8	23.3	1.2	
1980	137.5	0	0	
1981	164.2	0	0	
1982	400.6	200.1	1.2	
1983	534.2	383.3	499.8	
1984	568.1	415.8	555.9	
1985	607.3	447.5	583.5	
1986	623.6	460.9	545.8	
1987	599.1	469.5	534.5	
1988	769.1	635.0	430.7	
1989	559.7	421.3	367.1	
1990	548.1	422.4	283.4	
1991	149.6	141.8	0	
1992	27.1	0.6	7.2	
1993	74.2	8.0	0	
1994	68.4	0	0	
1995	23.1	10.1	0	
1996	22.8	0	0	
1997	57.2	0	0	
1998	36.3	0	0	
1999	102.1	6.7	0.2	
2000	45.7	0	0	
2001	228.0	0.5	0	
2002	937.3	744.7	1739.7	1386.1
2003	377.9	284.8	1760.2	1451.0
2004	406.1	316.6	891.4	794.1
2005	490.4	374.0	1397.1	1050.2
2006	689.4	488.5	1246.1	916.1
2007	688.6	498.9	1079.7	755.7
2008	614.5	392.1	1378.3	1014.9
2009	1353.7	1076.3	1114.3	685.0
2010	1867.1	1529.5	2524.6	1220.5
Note: All figures are in US$ (millions). Figures are adjusted for inflation in 2009 constant dollars and rounded for consistent accuracy.

== Criticism ==
U.S. aid to Pakistan has been characterized by a pattern of higher allocations during periods of military rule and reduced or negligible support during democratic governance. The aid has often aligned with U.S. strategic interests, which have historically favored relationships with military regimes for geopolitical advantages.
