= Eighth Five-Year Plans (Pakistan) =

Pakistani national programs for economic development

The Eighth Five-Year Plans for National Economy of Pakistan (or simply regarded as Eighth Five-Year Plans) was a set of a centralized and planned economic goals and targets designed to strengthen the economic development and performance of Pakistan between 1993 and 1998.

The plan was drafted and presented by then people-elected Prime minister Benazir Bhutto at the first session of parliament, as part of social capitalist policies for the improvement of economics development in Pakistan. After the termination of the seventh five-year plans on 30 June 1993, an annual plan was commenced and also integrated with the eighth plan and was finally launched by Benazir Bhutto on 31 May 1994. The framework of the plans and planning was started by Benazir Bhutto after successfully terminating the seventh plan, promulgated in 1988. At an Economic Coordination Committee (ECC) meeting chaired by Benazir Bhutto, the five-year plan was prepared with the consultation of provisional governments and federal bureaus of the government, comprising 28 technical committees that consisted of 2,500 technocrats from joint public and private sector. The plan reflected the initiatives and policy formation of the government in a view to geared up to a dynamic and equitable economic system.

The plan underscored a public-private partnership and gave priority to the empowerment and development of social and power sector, drainage and physical civil infrastructure. The plan did not fulfill all of the objectives of the planned targets, and in 1998, the plan was successfully terminated in a favor of continuing privatization programme of the upcoming people-elected prime minister, Nawaz Sharif.

== See also ==
- Planned economy
- National Economy of Pakistan
- Benazir Bhutto

== Government sources ==
Preceded by 7th Five-Year Plans; 1988 – 1993	8th Five-Year Plans; 1993–1998	Succeeded by Cancellation of Five-Year Plans Programme; Privatization Programme; Uraan Pakistan
