= Seventh Five-Year Plans (Pakistan) =

Pakistani national programs for economic development

The Seventh Five-Year Plans for National Economy of Pakistan, otherwise known as Seventh Plan, were a set of a highly centralized and planned economic development targets designed for the improvement of the standard of living, and overall strengthening of gross domestic product (GDP) growth in Pakistan, between the period of 1988 until its termination in 1993.

The seventh plan was drafted and presented by the Ministry of Finance (MoF), led by then popularly elected Prime Minister Benazir Bhutto, at the Parliament in 1988. The plan was studied by the Economic Coordination Committee (ECC) and resources were gathered to be allocated by the Planning Commission. The seventh plan was an integral part of Bhutto's social capitalist policies implementation and was also integrated with the nationalization programme of former Prime Minister Zulfikar Ali Bhutto. The plan emphasized macroeconomics principles and was intended to support the development of the agricultural and electricity sectors in Pakistan in order to keep up the GDP growth rate, which at that time was 6.6% – one of the highest in the world.

Under this plan, science policy was further expanded to integrate academic scientific development into national development plans. The seventh plan also took initiatives to revive deregulation of the corporate sector but did not privatize the sector into private-ownership management. Unlike the sixth plan, not all targets were met and goals were not sufficiently fulfilled. Only the agricultural and scientific development aspects of the plans were continued whilst all major initiatives were cancelled by the upcoming Prime Minister Nawaz Sharif who replaced the programme with an intensified privatization programme, launched in 1991.

== See also ==
- Planned economy
- Economy of Pakistan
- Benazir Bhutto

Preceded by 6th Five-Year Plans; 1988–1993	7th Five-Year Plans; 1988–1998; With: Nationalization Programme	Succeeded by Privatization programme (8th Five-Year Plans); 1988–1993
