= Standard of living in Pakistan =

Living conditions in Pakistan

The standard of living in Pakistan differentiates and varies between different classes of society. Pakistan is a largely developing country and according to the Human Development Index, is ranked 147th out of 170 countries, upper side of "low human development."

Despite having a growing middle class numbering over 70 million, a large portion of the country's population remains poor. Poverty, unemployment and a population boom contribute to Pakistan's current social problems. As of 2008, over 17% of the total population was found abjectly living below the poverty line while the unemployment rate, as of 2010, numbered up to an unprecedented 15%. According to the Asian Development Bank (ADB), 24.3% lived below the national poverty line in 2015. Poor governance, political insecurity, and religious persecution have further added to the issues faced by the average Pakistani family. The unemployment rate in Pakistan stood at roughly 6.42 percent. This rate reflects the proportion of individuals without employment within the country's labor force, which includes those who are both capable and willing to work.
