= Uraan Pakistan =

Economic project in Pakistan

Uraan Pakistan, officially titled National Economic Transformation Plan 2024–29, is a five-year economic strategy launched by Pakistani Prime Minister Shehbaz Sharif on 31 December 2024. It aims to drive sustainable growth and modernise Pakistan's economy through focused reforms and investments across critical sectors.

== Background ==
Pakistan has faced recurring macroeconomic instability, structural fiscal deficits, and weak export performance over several decades. In response, the government designed Uraan Pakistan around these challenges, intending to break the cycle of boom-and-bust growth.

The plan is oversee by the Ministry of Planning Development & Special Initiatives.

== Objectives ==
To improve Macroeconomic stabilisation by reducing deficits, controlling inflation, and building foreign reserves. To Achieve Export-Led growth, double annual exports to around $60 billion by 2029—and reach $3 trillion GDP by 2047. Digital transformation of the country by boosting ICT exports, expanding freelancing, and establishing a “Quantum Valley.” Sustainable developments to address climate change, boost water and food security, and expand green-energy infrastructure. Focus on Social equity to improve health coverage, literacy, gender workforce participation, and reduce youth unemployment.

== 5Es framework ==
The plan is structured around five pillars, often referred to as the “5 Es”:

1. Exports – Diversify and grow exports across IT, manufacturing, agriculture, creative industries, minerals, manpower, and blue economy.
2. E‑Pakistan – Promote digitalisation, ICT freelance market, unicorn startups, improved mobile penetration and AI adoption.
3. Energy & Infrastructure – Expand generation capacity, reduce circular debt, boost renewable share, complete mega dams and transport corridors.
4. Environment / Climate & Sustainability – Reduce emissions by 50%, increase water storage by 10 MAF, restore 20 million acres of land.
5. Equity, Ethics & Empowerment – Enhance social justice by improving health, literacy, and employment outcomes, particularly for youth and women.

== Key initiatives and projects ==
According to The Express Tribune, a total investment of Rs 17 trillion has been earmarked, with Rs 7 trillion from the federal government and Rs 10 trillion from provincial budgets. This investment covers major infrastructure initiatives, including Rs 33 b allocated for the Diamer-Bhasha Dam, Quetta‑Karachi Highway, K-IV water project, and various motorways developments.

In the social sector, funding targets education and health, with Rs 9 b for Danish Schools, Rs 4.3 b for the PM Skills Program, Rs 1 b to combat Hepatitis C, and Rs 800 m dedicated to diabetes treatment.

Additionally, the plan advances Pakistan's technology landscape through the creation of Quantum Valley and national centres focused on nanotechnology and quantum computing, which are currently under development.

== Institutional framework and governance ==
The National Economic Transformation Unit (NETU) was established to implement and monitor the plan, supported by a framework of KPIs, quarterly reviews, and public transparency.

The Ministry of Planning coordinates with provincial governments, multilateral partners (IMF, ADB, AIIB, World Bank), and private sector entities.

== Outcomes ==
By mid‑2025, key indicators showed early progress: inflation decreased from 11.8% to 3.5%, a current account surplus of ~$1.9 billion, remittances rose 31% to $31.2 b, and fiscal deficit narrowed from 3.7% to 2.6%. Government also streamlined the PSDP, dropping low-priority projects and reallocating funds more effectively.

== Reactions ==
- Mufti Muneeb-ur-Rehman, a senior religious scholar, observed that despite federal initiatives such as “Uraan Pakistan” and frequent foreign visits promising substantial investment, there has been little tangible progress. While memoranda of understanding (MOUs) and pledges of billions in foreign investment attract media attention, actual results remain elusive, and recent stock exchange data indicate a decline in foreign investment.
