= Infrastructure of Pakistan =

Overview of Infrastructure in Pakistan

The infrastructure in Pakistan has made some progress over the last five decades. However, compared to other similar countries, the rate of improvement in Pakistan has been among the slowest for the majority of public infrastructure sectors. Pakistan’s transportation infrastructure has suffered from government neglect. Infrastructure is a backbone of the economy and a well developed infrastructure is not only important to attract foreign investment, it also needed to maintain high growth rate but weak infrastructure has been one of the major factors restricting Pakistan’s economic growth and damaging its investment prospects.

Today, Pakistan is a low-middle-income country with about 242 million people. That not only places abysmally in the human development index, but also faces both rural and urban disparities in poverty, income, and development infrastructure.

Over the past four years, the Pakistani government has successfully staved off a balance-of-payments crisis, achieving some measure of macroeconomic stability. The comparatively poor infrastructural situation of Pakistan by international standards has negatively affected the lives of its citizens. The electricity shortages, lack of proper water and sanitation provisions, and above all else, the increase in population to an alarming level is lowering the standard of living. According to the World Economic Forum Survey (2006-07), of 125 countries, Pakistan ranked 67th in the basic infrastructure category. Historically, a continual imbalance between demand and supply of infrastructure facilities is seen. In The Global Competitiveness Report (GCR) 2012-2013 released by the World Economic Forum, Pakistan is graded among the bottom 20 of the 144 economies around the world.

== See also ==
- China–Pakistan Economic Corridor
