= Bhagowal =

Bhagowal may refer to following villages in Punjab, Pakistan:& India

- Bhagowal (District Sialkot), in the District of Sialkot
- Bhagowal Kalan, in the District of Gujrat
- Bhagowal Khurd, in the District of Gujrat
- Chak no.22 Bhagowal, in the District of Mandi Bahauddin
- Bhagwal, Chakwal, in District of Chakwal
- Bhaguwal in Kapurthala district Punjab, India
