= Nadeem Afzal Chan =

Pakistani politician

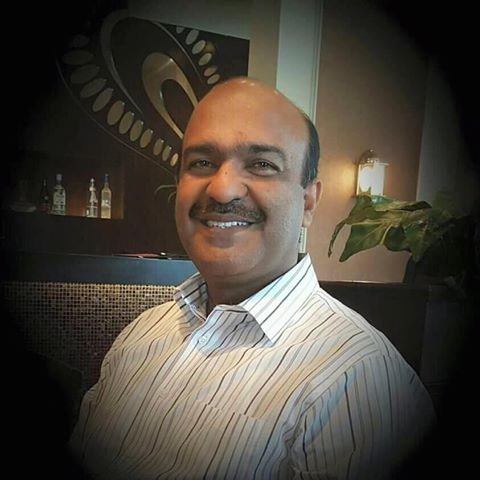
- Nadeem Afzal Chan

Spokesperson to the Prime Minister of Pakistan
- In office 15 January 2019 – 15 January 2021
- President: Arif Alvi
- Prime Minister: Imran Khan

Special Assistant to the Prime Minister on Parliamentary Coordination
- In office 15 January 2019 – 15 January 2021
- President: Arif Alvi
- Prime Minister: Imran Khan

Chairman Public Accounts Committee
- In office April 2012 – March 2013
- President: Asif Ali Zardari
- Prime Minister: Yusuf Raza Gillani

Member of the National Assembly of Pakistan
- In office 2008–2013
- Constituency: NA-64 (Sargodha-I)

Tehsil Nazim Malakwal
- In office 2001–2006
- Constituency: Malakwal

Personal details
- Born: 1 April 1975 (age 51) Mandi Bahauddin, Punjab, Pakistan
- Party: PPP (2008-2018: 2022-present); PTI (2018-2022)
- Relatives: Gulraiz Afzal Gondal (brother); Waseem Afzal Chan (brother); Nazar Muhammad Gondal (uncle)

Nadeem Afzal Chan (Punjabi, Urdu: ندیم افضل چن; born 1 April 1975) also known as Nadeem Afzal Gondal is a Pakistani politician who served as spokesperson of the Prime Minister of Pakistan, in office from 15 January 2019 to 15 January 2021 He was a member of the National Assembly of Pakistan from 2008 to 2013.

== Early life ==
He was born on 1 April 1975. He belongs to the Gondal family of Mandi Bahauddin.

== Political career ==
He began his political career as a tehsil nazim from Malakwal in 2001.

He was elected to the National Assembly of Pakistan from Constituency NA-64 (Sargodha-I) as a candidate of Pakistan Peoples Party (PPP) in Pakistani general election, 2008. He received 65,628 and defeated Muhammad Farooq Baha-ul-Haq Shah, a candidate of Pakistan Muslim League (N) (PML-N). In the same election, he ran for the seat of the Provincial Assembly of the Punjab from Constituency PP-119 (Mandi Bahuddin-IV) as an independent candidate, but was unsuccessful. He received 316 votes and lost the seat to Waseem Afzal Gondal, a candidate of PPP. He served as the chairman of the National Assembly's Public Accounts Committee from April 2012 to March 2013.

He ran for the seat of the National Assembly from Constituency NA-64 (Sargodha-I) as a candidate of PPP in Pakistani general election, 2013 but was unsuccessful. He received 67,212 votes and lost the seat to Muhammad Amin Ul Hasnat Shah.

In October 2017, he resigned from the post of Secretary General of PPP Punjab.

In April 2018, he quit PPP and joined Pakistan Tehreek-e-Insaf (PTI).

He ran for the seat of the National Assembly from Constituency NA-88 (Sargodha-I) as a candidate of PTI in Pakistani general election, 2018 but was unsuccessful.

On 15 January 2019, Prime Minister Imran Khan appointed Chan as his spokesperson, in honorary capacity. The same day, he was also appointed as Special Assistant to the Prime Minister Imran Khan on Parliamentary Coordination, in an honorary capacity. On August 23, 2019, media sources claimed that he resigned from his position, but the Pakistani government denied the rumours.

In January 2021 he resigned as spokesperson to Prime Minister Imran Khan and Special Assistant to Prime Minister. His resignation was accepted by Imran Khan on 15 January 2021. In March 2022, Chan rejoined Pakistan Peoples Party after meeting with the party's chairman Bilawal Bhutto Zardari and said joining PTI was a wrong decision.
