= Chaudhry Akhtar Abbas Bosal =

Pakistani politician

Member of the Provincial Assembly of the Punjab

Personal details
- Born: 30 November 1973 (age 52)
- Party: PMLN (1998-present)

Chaudhry Akhtar Abbas is a Pakistani politician who is a Member of the Provincial Assembly of the Punjab from the constituency PP-43(Malakwal), and has previously remained a member of the Punjab assembly from August 2013 to May 2018.

== Early life and Family ==
He was born on 30 November 1973 into a landlord Jatt family known as king of the bar. He hails from Tibba Chaudhry Manak Bosal, Mandi Bahauddin. He belongs to a political family. His maternal grandfather Chaudhry Jahan Khan Bosal was elected as Member of Punjab Legislative Assembly in 1946 elections from Gujrat. His paternal grandfather Chaudhry Manak Khan Bosal, in whose name Akhtar’s ancestral village has been named, remained a Member of Sixth Legislator of Provincial Assembly of West Pakistan (1956-1969). His Father Muhammad Nawaz Bosal remained a member of National Assembly of Pakistan for two terms, 1985 to 1988, and 1990 to 1993. He was also elected as a member of provincial assembly of Punjab in 1977. His uncle Muhammad Iqbal Bosal was elected as Member National Assembly of Pakistan from Mandi Bahauddin by defeating Nazar Muhammad Gondal in 1997 general elections. His cousin Imdad Ullah Bosal, son of Ch Muhammad Iqbal Bosal is a Pakistani civil servant who serves in BPS-22 grade as Secretary Finance Division. He was the Chief Secretary, Government of Khyber Pakhtunkhwa from February 2023 to March 2023. He belongs to the Pakistan Administrative Service. His cousin Chaudhry Nasir Iqbal Bosal is currently a Member National Assembly of Pakistan from Mandi Bahauddin, and remained MNA for two terms, 2013 to 2018, and 2018 to 2023.

== Political career ==
He was elected to the Provincial Assembly of the Punjab as a candidate of Pakistan Muslim League (Nawaz) from Constituency PP-118 (Mandi Bahauddin-III) in by-polls held in August 2013.

He is currently a member of the provincial assembly of Punjab from the constituency PP-43 Malakwal, Mandibhauddin.
