= NA-69 Mandi Bahauddin-II =

Constituency for the National Assembly of Pakistan

- Constituency for the National Assembly of Pakistan
- Region: Malakwal Tehsil, Mandi Bahauddin Tehsil (partly) and Phalia Tehsil (partly) of Mandi Bahauddin District
- Electorate: 601,901

Current constituency
- Party: Pakistan Muslim League (N)
- Member: Nasir Iqbal Bosal
- Created from: NA-109 Mandi Bahauddin-II

NA-69 Mandi Bahauddin-II (این اے-69 منڈى بہاوالدین-2) is a constituency for the National Assembly of Pakistan.

== Members of Parliament ==
=== 2018–2023: NA-86 Mandi Bahauddin-II ===
Election	Member	Party
2018	Nasir Iqbal Bosal	PML (N)

=== 2024–present: NA-69 Mandi Bahuddin-II ===
Election	Member	Party
2024	Nasir Iqbal Bosal	PML (N)

== Election 2002 ==
General elections were held on 10 October 2002. Major(R) Zulfiqar Ali Gondal of PPP won by securing 71,424 votes.

General election 2002: NA-109 Mandi Bahauddin-II
Party	Candidate	Votes	%	±%
PPP	Zulfiqar Ali Gondal	71,424	45.06	
PML(Q)	Nasir Iqbal Bosal	64,968	40.99	
PML(N)	Munwar Iqbal Gondal	20,455	12.91	
Independent	Ch. Manzoor Hussain Dhudra	1,654	1.04	
Turnout		163,644	45.10	
Total valid votes		158,501	96.86	
Rejected ballots		5,143	3.14	
Majority		6,456	4.07	
Registered electors		362,887		

== Election 2008 ==
General elections were held on 18 February 2008. Nazar Muhammad Gondal of PPP won by 74,163 votes.

General election 2008: NA-109 Mandi Bahauddin-II
Party	Candidate	Votes	%	±%
PPP	Nazar Muhammad Gondal	74,163	44.94	▼0.12
PML(Q)	Nasir Iqbal Bosal	67,489	40.90	▼0.09
PML(N)	Imtiaz Ahmad Gondal	21,239	12.87	▼0.04
Others	Others (two candidates)	2,122	1.25	
Turnout		169,738	54.76	▲9.66
Total valid votes		165,013	97.22	
Rejected ballots		4,725	2.78	
Majority		6,674	4.04	▼0.03
Registered electors		309,950		
PPP hold				

== Election 2013 ==
General elections were held on 11 May 2013. Nasir Iqbal Bosal from Pakistan Muslim League (N) won by scoring 135,501 votes. Nazar Muhammad Gondal of Pakistan Peoples Party was runner-up who secured 44,528 votes.

General election 2013: NA-109 Mandi Bahauddin-II
Party	Candidate	Votes	%	±%
PML(N)	Nasir Iqbal Bosal	135,501	64.37	▲51.50
PPP	Nazar Muhammad Gondal	44,528	21.15	▼23.79
PTI	Muhammad Nawaz Gondal	13,813	6.56	
Others	Others (twelve candidates)	16,659	7.92	
Turnout		216,946	56.40	▲1.74
Total valid votes		210,501	97.03	
Rejected ballots		6,445	2.97	
Majority		90,973	43.22	
Registered electors		384,637		
PML(N) gain from PPP				

== Election 2018 ==
General elections were held on 25 July 2018. Nasir Iqbal Bosal won the seat.

General election 2018: NA-86 Mandi Bahauddin-II
Party	Candidate	Votes	%	±%
PML(N)	Nasir Iqbal Bosal	147,105	52.15	▼12.22
PTI	Nazar Muhammad Gondal	80,637	28.59	▲22.03
Others	Others (six candidates)	38,779	13.75	
Turnout		282,089	55.05	▼1.35
Rejected ballots		15,568	5.51	
Majority		66,468	23.56	
Registered electors		512,410		

== Election 2024 ==
General elections were held on 8 February 2024. Nasir Iqbal Bosal won the election with 113,506 votes.

General election 2024: NA-69 Mandi Bahauddin-II
Party	Candidate	Votes	%	±%
PML(N)	Nasir Iqbal Bosal	113,506	39.46	▼12.69
PTI	Kausar Parveen Bhatti (Note: Filed nomination papers as PTI candidate but ECP allowed her to run as an Independent)	108,900	37.86	▲9.27
Independent	Nazar Muhammad Gondal	28,114	9.77	N/A
TLP	Shehzad Ullah Chatha	13,132	4.57	N/A
Others	Others (sixteen candidates)	23,971	8.33	
Turnout		299,269	49.72	▼5.33
Total valid votes		287,623	95.99	
Rejected ballots		11,646	4.01	
Majority		4,606	1.60	▼21.96
Registered electors		601,901		
PML(N) hold				

== See also ==
- NA-68 Mandi Bahauddin-I
- NA-70 Sialkot-I
