= Ajjowal =

Coordinates: 32°30′N 73°18′E

Ajjowal (اجووال) is a small village of Malikwal Tehsil, Mandi Bahauddin District in the Punjab province of Pakistan.

It is located at 32°30'0N 73°18'0E with an altitude of 218 metres (718 feet). The village is 26 km from Mandi Bahauddin city and 16 km from Malakwal and situated on Kuthiala road. The union council of Ajjowal is Wara Alam Shah. The total land of this village is 2,000 acres. Most of villagers are farmers and there are some government employees.
