= NA-82 Sargodha-I =

Constituency for the National Assembly of Pakistan

- Constituency for the National Assembly of Pakistan
- Region: Bhera Tehsil, Bhalwal Tehsil and Sargodha Tehsil (partly) of Sargodha District
- Electorate: 563,116

Current constituency
- Party: Pakistan Muslim League (N)
- Member: Mukhtar Ahmad Bharath
- Created from: NA-64 Sargodha-I

NA-82 Sargodha-I (این اے-82، سرگودھا-١) is a constituency for the National Assembly of Pakistan.

== Members of Parliament ==
=== 1988–2002: NA-47 Sargodha-I ===
Election	Member	Party
1988	Ehsan-ul-Haq Piracha	PPP
1990	Ehsan-ul-Haq Piracha	PDA
1993	Ghulam Hussain Cheema	PML-N
1997	Malik Adnan Hayat Khan Noon	PML-N

=== 2002–2018: NA-64 Sargodha-I ===
Election	Member	Party
2002	Inam-ul-Haq Piracha	PPPP
2005 by-election	Haroon Ehsan Piracha	PML-Q
2008	Nadeem Afzal Gondal Chan	PPPP
2013	Pir Aminul Hasnat Shah	PML-N

=== 2018–2023: NA-88 Sargodha-I ===
Election	Member	Party
2018	Mukhtar Ahmad Bharath	PML (N)

=== 2024–present: NA-82 Sargodha-I ===
Election	Member	Party
2024	Mukhtar Ahmad Bharath	PML (N)

== Election 2002 ==
General elections were held on 10 October 2002. Inam-ul-Haq Paracha of Pakistan Peoples Party Parliamentarian (PPPP) won by 69,815 votes.

General election 2002: NA-64 Sargodha-I
Party	Candidate	Votes	%	±%
PPP	Inam-Ul-Haq Paracha	69,815	43.34	
PML(N)	Pirzada Muhammad Ibrahim Shah	43,396	26.94	
PML(Q)	Ch. Muhammad Ali	42,781	26.56	
Others	Others (three candidates)	5,080	3.16	
Turnout		165,495	50.24	
Total valid votes		161,072	97.33	
Rejected ballots		4,423	2.67	
Majority		26,419	16.40	
Registered electors		329,423		

== Election 2008 ==
The result of general election 2008 in this constituency is given below.

=== Result ===
Nadeem Afzal Gondal succeeded in the election 2008 and became the member of National Assembly.

General election 2008: NA-64 Sargodha-I
Party	Candidate	Votes	%	±%
PPP	Nadeem Afzal Gondal	65,628	37.16	
PML(N)	Muhammad Farooq Baha-UI-Haq Shah	60,460	34.24	
PML(Q)	Haroon Ehsan Piracha	45,390	25.70	
Others	Others (two candidates)	5,127	2.90	
Turnout		182,292	42.40	
Total valid votes		176,605	96.88	
Rejected ballots		5,687	3.12	
Majority		5,168	2.92	
Registered electors		429,937		
PPP hold				

== Election 2013 ==
General elections were held on 11 May 2013. Shaykh Muhammad Amin al-Hasanat Shah of PML-N succeeded in the elections with 151,690 votes and became the member of National Assembly.

General election 2013: NA-64 Sargodha-I
Party	Candidate	Votes	%	±%
PML(N)	Muhammad Amin UI Hasnat Shah	151,690	63.52	
PPP	Nadeem Afzal Chan	67,212	28.14	
PTI	Waseem Abbas	11,813	4.95	
Others	Others (seven candidates)	8,105	3.39	
Turnout		247,865	59.66	
Total valid votes		238,820	96.35	
Rejected ballots		9,045	3.65	
Majority		84,478	35.38	
Registered electors		415,491		
PML(N) gain from PPP				

== Election 2018 ==
General elections were held on 25 July 2018.

General election 2018: NA-88 Sargodha-I
Party	Candidate	Votes	%	±%
PML(N)	Mukhtar Ahmad Bharath	130,302	47.04	
PTI	Nadeem Afzal Chan	116,420	42.03	
Others	Others (four candidates)	30,303	10.94	
Turnout		284,977	57.38	
Rejected ballots		7,952	2.79	
Majority		13,882	5.01	
Registered electors		496,664		
PML(N) hold		Swing	N/A	

== Election 2024 ==
General elections were held on 8 February 2024. Mukhtar Ahmad Bharath won the election with 108,954 votes.

General election 2024: NA-82 Sargodha-I
Party	Candidate	Votes	%	±%
PML(N)	Mukhtar Ahmad Bharath	108,954	38.25	▼4.79
PPP	Nadeem Afzal Chan	87,458	30.70	▲26.09
PTI	Haroon Ihsan Piracha (Note: Filed nomination papers as PTI candidate but ECP allowed him to run as an Independent)	60,538	21.25	▼20.78
TLP	Saqib Hussain	14,914	5.24	▲1.13
Others	Others (seven candidates)	12,970	4.55	
Turnout		293,739	52.16	▼5.22
Total valid votes		284,834	96.97	
Rejected ballots		8,905	3.03	
Majority		21,496	7.55	▲2.54
Registered electors		563,116		
PML(N) hold		Swing	N/A	

== See also ==
- NA-81 Gujranwala-V
- NA-83 Sargodha-II
