= PP-43 Mandi Bahauddin-IV =

Constituency of the Punjabi Provincial Legislature, Pakistan

- Constituency for the Provincial Assembly of Punjab
- Region: Mandi Bahauddin Tehsil (partly) and Malakwal Tehsil (partly) including Malakwal city in Mandi Bahauddin District

Current constituency
- Created from: PP-119 Mandi Bahauddin-IV & Constituency PP-120 Mandi Bahauddin-V (2002-2018); PP-68 Mandi Bahauddin-IV (2018-2023)

PP-43 Mandi Bahauddin-IV (پی پی-43،منڈی بہاؤالدین-4) is a Constituency of Provincial Assembly of Punjab.

== General elections 2024 ==
Provincial election 2024: PP-43 Mandi Bahauddin-IV
Party	Candidate	Votes	%	±%
PML(N)	Ch Akhter Abbas Bosal	45,636	32.44	
Independent	Chaudhary Muhammad Nawaz (Note: Filed nomination papers as PTI candidate but ECP allowed him to run as an Independent)	37,906	26.94	
Independent	Waseem Afzal Gondal	26,727	19.00	
Independent	Qamar Khan	11,579	8.23	
Independent	Gulraiz Afzal Gondal	7,355	5.23	
TLP	Shahzad Ullah Chattha	5,981	4.25	
Others	Others (thirty candidates)	5,502	3.91	
Turnout		149,883	48.68	
Total valid votes		140,686	93.86	
Rejected ballots		9,197	6.14	
Majority		7,730	5.50	
Registered electors		307,886		
hold				

== General elections 2018 ==
Provincial election 2018: PP-68 Mandi Bahauddin-IV
Party	Candidate	Votes	%	±%
PTI	Gulraiz Afzal Gondal	37,982	28.57	
Independent	Qamar Khan	35,791	26.93	
PML(N)	Syed Muhammad Mehfooz Mashdi	24,551	18.47	
Independent	Chaudhry Muhammad Arif Gondal	12,904	9.71	
PPP	Nasar Abbas Tarar	6,262	4.71	
TLP	Abdul Rauf	5,503	4.14	
Independent	Zafar Iqbal Gondal	2,645	1.99	
Independent	Muhammad Aslam	2,048	1.54	
Independent	Tahir Mahmood Gondal	1,559	1.17	
Others	Others (eleven candidates)	3,682	2.77	
Turnout		142,486	53.69	
Total valid votes		132,927	93.29	
Rejected ballots		9,559	6.71	
Majority		2,191	1.64	
Registered electors		265,381		

== General elections 2013 ==
Provincial election 2013: PP-119 Mandi Bahauddin-IV
Party	Candidate	Votes	%	±%
PML(N)	Shafqat Mahmood	28,441	31.91	
Independent	Ghulam Hussain Bosal	22,633	25.39	
PPP	Hajji Muhammad Afzal Chan	19,734	22.14	
Independent	Nasir Abbas Tarrar	5,072	5.69	
PTI	Faisal Mukhtar Gondal	5,042	5.66	
Independent	Muhammad Nawaz Gondal	2,132	2.39	
Independent	Ch. Qamar Abbas Bosal	1,613	1.81	
Independent	Raja Khuram Hayat Khan	1,444	1.62	
Others	Others (nine candidates)	3,019	3.39	
Turnout		91,370	56.51	
Total valid votes		89,130	97.55	
Rejected ballots		2,240	2.45	
Majority		5,808	6.52	
Registered electors		161,684		

== General elections 2008 ==
Provincial election 2008: PP-119 Mandi Bahauddin-IV
Party	Candidate	Votes	%	±%
PPP	Waseem Afzal Gondal	30,126	44.03	
PML(Q)	Major (R) Ehsan Elahi Ch.	19,833	28.99	
PML(N)	Shafqat Mehmood Gondal	17,015	24.87	
MQM-P	Ch. Zafar Iqbal Ranjha	579	0.85	
Independent	Ch. Usman Manzoor Dhudra	553	0.81	
Independent	Nadeem Afzal Gondal	316	0.46	
Turnout		70,483	54.02	
Total valid votes		68,422	97.08	
Rejected ballots		2,061	2.92	
Majority		10,293	15.04	
Registered electors		130,481		

== See also ==
- PP-42 Mandi Bahauddin-III
- PP-44 Sialkot-I
