= Dale Philip =

Scottish YouTuber

- Born: Edinburgh, Scotland
- Citizenship: British
- Years active: 2006–present

YouTube information
- Channel: Dale Philip
- Years active: 2017–present
- Genre: Travel vlogger
- Subscribers: 3.68 million
- Views: 2.15 billion
- Last updated: 1 February 2025

Dale Philip is a Scottish YouTuber and former poker player. He has won several online poker tournaments in his peak career.

== Early life ==
Philip was born in Edinburgh, Scotland.

== Career ==
Philip used to work an IT/software job, but with his success in playing poker he decided to quit his job in 2010. After leaving Edinburgh, Scotland for a short time to travel for poker tournaments, he chose being a poker player as a full time profession.

He was later removed from Team PokerStars Online on 17 June 2014, allegedly due to his behavior at an event in Marbella, Spain.

As of now, Philip is a YouTube travel vlogger and has visited more than 50 countries.

In June 2020, he posted a TikTok video of him bargaining for a street snack (Sutarfeni) in Jaipur, Rajasthan, India which created a debate online.

In January 2021, Philip was booked in Kerala, India by Munnar District Forest Officer (DFO) for entering the Munnar forest without permission and wearing the incorrect clothing.

Philip went to Clifton Beach, Karachi, Pakistan, in May 2022, where he was allegedly 'cheated' by horsemen there, about which he later posted a video on social media with the title "avoid this horse ride scam". In response to this, Karachi Police arrested the horseman within hours.
