= Gulraiz Afzal Gondal =

Pakistani politician

Gulraiz Afzal Chan
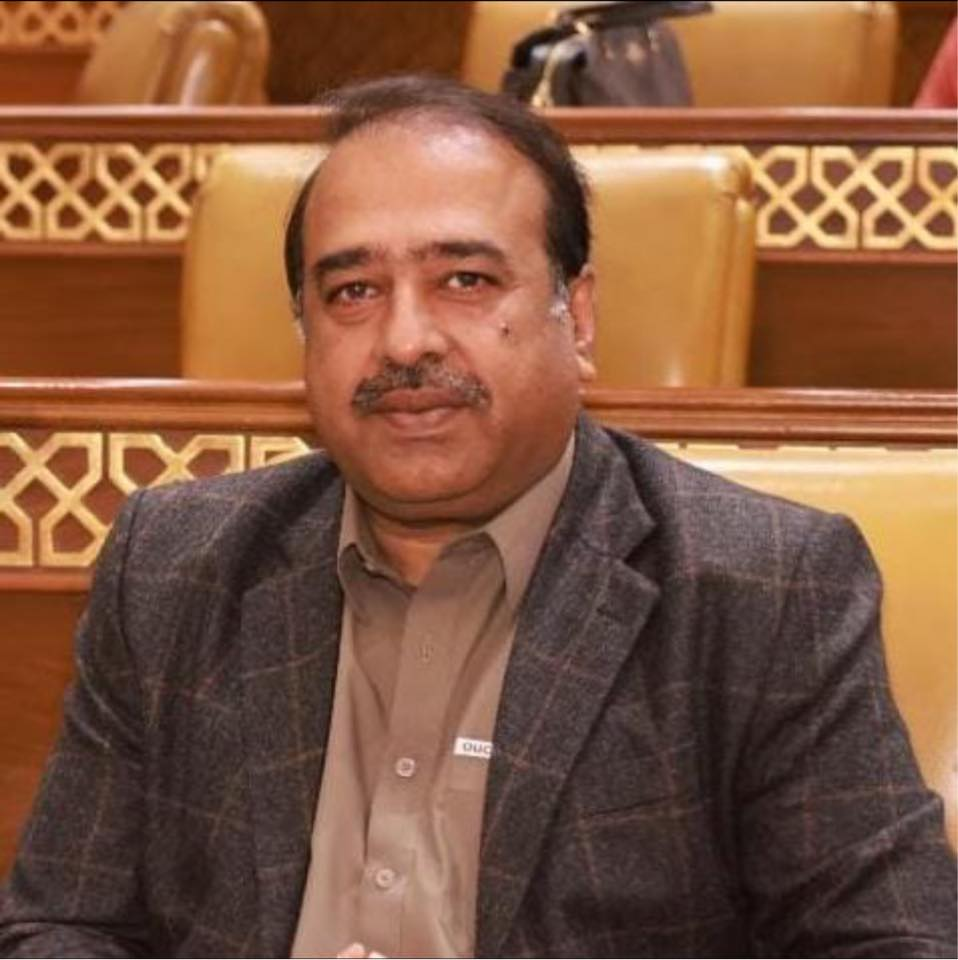

Member of the Provincial Assembly of the Punjab
- In office 15 August 2018 – 14 January 2023
- Constituency: PP-68 Mandi Bahauddin-IV

Personal details
- Party: PPP (2025-present)
- Other political affiliations: PTI (2018-2023)
- Relations: Nadeem Afzal Chan (brother) Nazar Muhammad Gondal (father in law) Waseem Afzal Chan (brother)
- Children: 4

Gulraiz Afzal Chan, also known as Gulraiz Afzal Gondal, is a Pakistani politician who served as a member of the Provincial Assembly of the Punjab from August 2018 to January 2023. He is the son of former MPA Haji Muhammad Afzal Chan the founder of Mandi Bahauddin, and the elder brother of Nadeem Afzal Chan and Waseem Afzal Chan. He is also the son-in-law of Nazar Muhammad Gondal.

== Family ==
Chan belongs to a prominent political family of Gondals. His father, Haji Muhammad Afzal Chan, served as a Member of the Provincial Assembly of the Punjab (PPP) for four consecutive terms from 1985 to 1996, during which he also held various ministerial positions. His brother, Nadeem Afzal Chan, served as Tehsil Nazim of Malakwal from 2001 to 2006, was elected to the National Assembly in 2008 as a PPP candidate, and chaired the Public Accounts Committee. After leaving the PPP in 2017, he joined PTI and worked as Special Assistant and spokesperson to Prime Minister Imran Khan until his resignation in 2021 due to policy disagreements. He rejoined the PPP in 2022 and currently holds the position of Information Secretary of PPP. Another brother, Waseem Afzal Chan, was a Member of the Punjab Assembly from 2008 to 2013. His father-in-law, Nazar Muhammad Gondal, was elected multiple times to the National Assembly and held key federal portfolios, including Minister for Narcotics Control, Minister for Food and Agriculture, and Minister for Capital Administration. He also served as District Nazim of Mandi Bahauddin and as Parliamentary Secretary for the Establishment Division.

== Political career ==
He was elected to the Provincial Assembly of the Punjab as a candidate of Pakistan Tehreek-e-Insaf from Constituency PP-68 (Mandi Bahauddin-IV) in the 2018 Pakistani general election. In the 2018 Punjab provincial elections for Constituency PP-68 (Mandi Bahauddin-IV), Gulraiz Afzal Gondal of Pakistan Tehreek-e-Insaf (PTI) secured the first position with 37,169 votes. The runner-up was Qamar Khan, an independent candidate, who received 35,414 votes.
