= Rukkan =

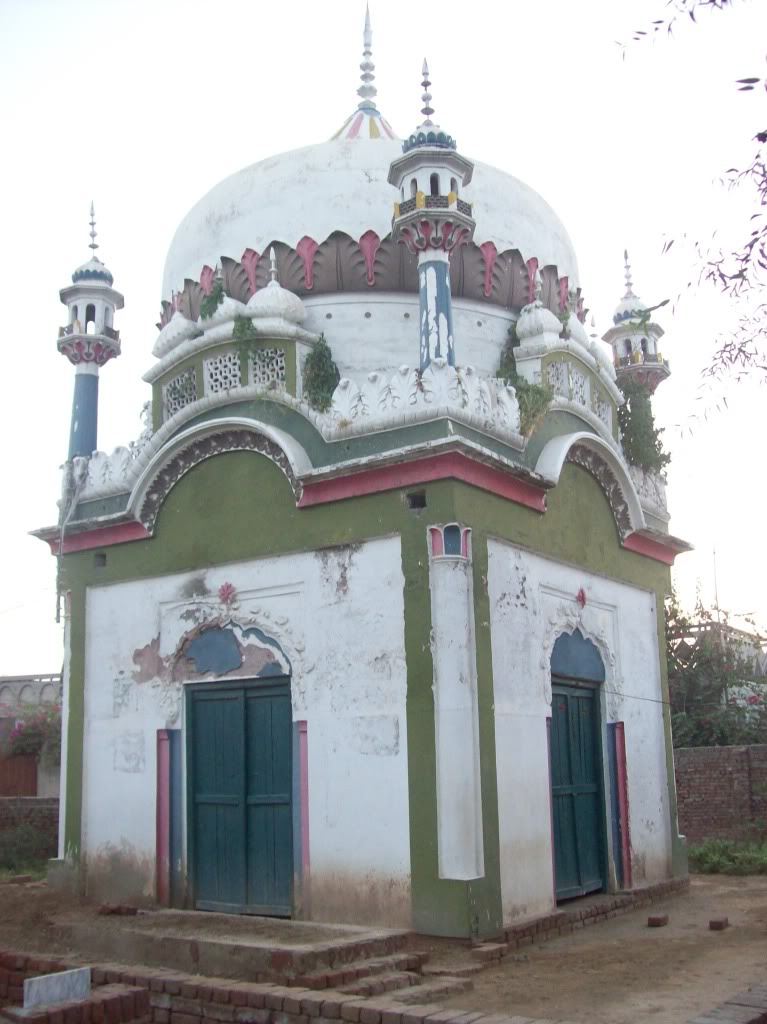

- Location within Pakistan
- Coordinates: 32°25′25″N 73°16′20″E Famous Personality رکن = Ali Hamza Khokhar - Ahmad Vlagz - Zack Qamar -Tarak Poori - Dhafqat Mahmood - Nawaz Panjutha -
- Country: Pakistan
- Province: Punjab
- District: Mandi Bahauddin
- Tehsil: Malakwal
- Banks: 2

Government
  - Language: Punjabi/Urdu

Population
  - Total: 60,000+
- Time zone: UTC+5 (PST)
  - Summer (DST): UTC+6 (DST)
- Postal Code: 50530
- Area code: 0546
- Website: mbdin.com/rukkan/

Rukkan (Urdu: ركن) is a village of Mandi Bahauddin District, Punjab, Pakistan. It is around 31 km from Mandi Bahauddin, 17 km from Malakwal and 4 km from Gojra.( Connect around 16 village )

== Population ==
The village contains about 10,000 houses, and a population of 50,000.
