= Economy of Islamabad =

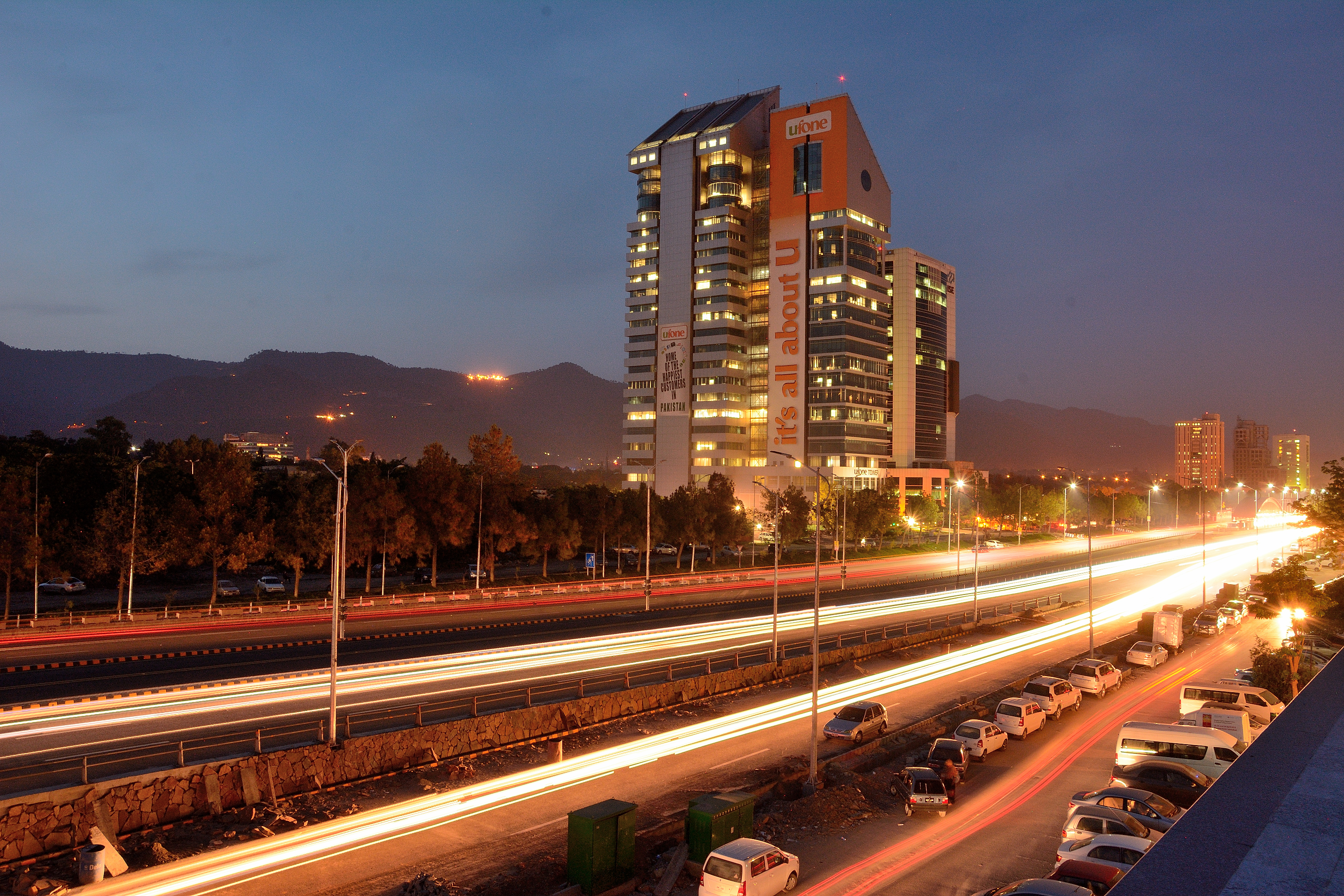
Downtown Islamabad

Islamabad is the capital of Pakistan and a net contributor to the Pakistani economy. Whilst having only 0.8% of the country's population, it contributes 1% to the country's GDP. The Islamabad Stock Exchange, founded in 1989, is Pakistan's third largest stock exchange after Karachi Stock Exchange and Lahore Stock Exchange. The exchange has 118 members with 104 corporate bodies and 18 individual members. The average daily turnover of the stock exchange is over 1 million shares. As of 2012, Islamabad LTU (Large Tax Unit) was responsible for Rs 371 billion in tax revenue, which amounts to 20% of all the revenue collected by the Federal Board of Revenue (FBR) as of 2012.

Islamabad has seen an expansion in information and communications technology with the addition of three software technology parks which house numerous national and foreign technological and IT companies. The tech parks are located in Evacuee Trust Complex, Awami Markaz and I-9 sector. Awami Markaz houses 36 IT companies while Evacuee Trust house 29 companies. Call centers for foreign companies have been targeted as another significant area of growth, with the government making efforts to reduce taxes by as much as 10% in order to encourage foreign investments in the IT sector.

Most of Pakistan's state-owned companies like Pakistan International Airlines, Pakistan Television Corporation, PTCL, Oil & Gas Development Company, and Zarai Taraqiati Bank are based in Islamabad. The city is home to many branches of Karachi-based companies, banks, and TV channels. Headquarters of all major telecommunication operators such as PTCL, Mobilink, Telenor, Ufone and China Mobile are located in Islamabad.

The rich history of Faysal Mosque in Islamabad, Pakistan.

The history of Islamabad is unique in itself as it is an artificially built city unique designed to fulfill the vital functions of the capital of the country.

== Business ==
According to the World Bank's Doing Business Report of 2010, Islamabad was ranked as the best place to start a business in Pakistan.
