= Mukhtar Ahmad Bharath =

Pakistani politician (born 1976)

Malik Mukhtar Ahmad Bharath

Member of the National Assembly of Pakistan
- In office 13 August 2018 – 10 August 2023
- Constituency: NA-88 (Sargodha-I)

Member of the Provincial Assembly of the Punjab
- In office 2002 – 31 May 2018

Personal details
- Born: 29 September 1976 (age 50) Lahore, Punjab, Pakistan
- Party: PMLN (2013-present)
- Other political affiliations: PML(Q) (2013-2008); PMLN (2002)

Malik Mukhtar Ahmad Bharath (born 29 September 1976) is a Pakistani politician who has been a member of the National Assembly of Pakistan since February 2024 and previously served in this position from August 2018 till August 2023. Previously he was a Member of the Provincial Assembly of the Punjab, from 2002 to May 2018. He has been serving as minister of State since March 2025.

== Early life and education ==
He was born on 29 September 1976 in Lahore.

He has the degree of Bachelor of Medicine and Bachelor of Surgery which he received in 2001 from Quaid-e-Azam Medical College.

== Political career ==
He was elected to the Provincial Assembly of the Punjab as a candidate of Pakistan Muslim League (N) (PML-N) from Constituency PP-28 (Sargodha-I) in the 2002 Pakistani general election. He received 32,480 votes and defeated Haroon Ehsan Paracha, a candidate of Pakistan Peoples Party (PPP).

He was re-elected to the Provincial Assembly of the Punjab as a candidate of Pakistan Muslim League (Q) (PML-Q) from Constituency PP-28 (Sargodha-I) in the 2008 Pakistani general election. He received 45,686 votes and defeated Haji Mushtaq Ahmed Gondal, a candidate of PPP.

He was re-elected to the Provincial Assembly of the Punjab as a candidate of PML-N from Constituency PP-28 (Sargodha-I) in the 2013 Pakistani general election. He received 58,531 votes and defeated Hassan Inam Piracha, a candidate of Pakistan Tehreek-e-Insaf (PTI). In June 2017, he was inducted into the provincial Punjab cabinet of Chief Minister Shehbaz Sharif and was made Provincial Minister of Punjab for Population Welfare.

He was elected to the National Assembly of Pakistan as a candidate of PML-N from NA-88 (Sargodha-I) in the 2018 Pakistani general election.

He was re-elected to the National Assembly as a candidate of PML-N from NA-82 Sargodha-I in the 2024 Pakistani general election. He received 108,954 votes and defeated Nadeem Afzal Chan, a candidate of PPP.
