= Chak No. 22 =

Chak No. 22 Bhagowal چک نمبر22بھاگووال
- Village
- Map of Village Chak No. 22 (highlighted)
- Country: Pakistan
- Province: Punjab
- District: Mandi Bahauddin
- Tehsil: Malakwal
- Time zone: UTC+5 (PST)

Chak No. 22 Bhagowal (چک نمبر22 بھاگووال) is the main village of Tehsil Malakwal, Mandi Bahauddin District, in Pakistan's Punjab province.

== Climate ==
Bhagowal is classified as a local steppe climate and BSh by the Köppen-Geiger system. It is a place of low rainfall, averaging 578 millimetres (22.8 in) of precipitation annually, ranging from an average of 5 mm in November to an average of 167 mm in August.

The temperature averages 23.9 °C (75.0 °F), ranging from an average of 33.8 degrees Celsius in June to average of temperature of 12.2 degrees Celsius in January.
