= Securities and Exchange Commission of Pakistan =

Financial regulator in Pakistan

- کمیشن اوراق بهادار و بورس پاکستان

Agency overview
- Formed: 1 January 1999
- Preceding agency: Corporate Law Authority
- Jurisdiction: Pakistan
- Headquarters: Islamabad, Pakistan
- Agency executive: Akif Saeed, Chairman/commissioner
- Website: http://www.secp.gov.pk

The Securities and Exchange Commission of Pakistan (SECP; Urdu: کمیشن اوراق بهادار و بورس پاکستان), formerly known as Company Law Administration, Company Law Board, and Corporate Law Authority, is the corporate legislative and financial regulatory agency of Pakistan whose objective is to develop a modern and efficient corporate sector and a capital market based on sound authority principles, in order to encourage investment and foster economic growth and prosperity in Pakistan.

The SECP is a collegiate body with collective responsibility. The operational and executive authority of the SECP is vested in the Chairman who is the SECP's chief executive officer (CEO). The Chairman is assisted by four Commissioners to oversee the working of various operational units as may be determined by him. The SECP has nine company registration offices located in Islamabad, Karachi, Lahore, Multan, Peshawar, Sukkur, Faisalabad, Quetta and Gilgit-Baltistan.

== History ==
The history of the Securities and Exchange Commission of Pakistan (SECP) traces back to the amendment of the Companies Act in 1956, which led to the establishment of the Board of Company Law Administration (BCLA) in 1963. Subsequent amendments in 1988 transformed the BCLA into the Company Law Board (CLB).

The regulatory framework in Pakistan expanded in 1981 to include the Corporate Law Authority (CLA) under the Companies Ordinance of 1984. The process of the CLA's restructuring was started in 1997 under the Capital Market Development Plan of the Asian Development Bank (ADB). The transition to the SECP was completed with the Securities and Exchange Commission of Pakistan Act of 1997, which dissolved the CLA and transferred its functions to the SECP. This act effectively nullified the earlier provisions of the Companies Ordinance related to the CLA. The parliament passed the Securities and Exchange Commission of Pakistan Act, which was promulgated in December 1997. Consequently, the SECP, having an autonomous status, became operational on 1 January 1999. The Act gave the organization the administrative authority and financial autonomy to carry out the reform program for Pakistan's capital market.

The scope of the authority of the SECP has been gradually widened. The insurance sector, non-banking financial companies, and pension funds have been added to the purview of the SECP. Now the SECP's mandate includes investment financial services, leasing companies, housing finance services, venture capital investment, discounting services, investment advisory services, real estate investment trust and asset management services, etc. The SECP also regulates various external service providers that are linked to the corporate sector, like chartered accountants, rating agencies, insurance companies, corporate secretaries and others.

== Divisions ==
The SECP is divided into the following divisions:

- Adjudication Division
- Licensing and Registration Division
- Insurance Division
- Legal Affairs Division
- Securities Market Division
- Specialized Companies Division
- Supervision Division
- Support Services Division

== See also ==
- Pakistan Inc
- Economy of Pakistan
- Karachi Stock Exchange
- Lahore Stock Exchange
- Islamabad Stock Exchange
- International Financial Reporting Standards
- Securities commission
- List of company registers
- Pakistan Stock Exchange
- List of financial supervisory authorities by country
