= Chaudhry Mushtaq Ahmed =

Justice of the Lahore High Court

Justice of the Lahore High Court
- Incumbent
- Assumed office 7 November 2014

District and Sessions Judge
- In office February 2007 – 6 November 2014

Additional District and Sessions Judge
- In office 2 January 1999 – February 2007

Advocate Lahore High Court
- In office 1987–1998

Advocate District Bar Association Rawalpindi
- In office 1985–1987

Personal details
- Born: 7 April 1959 (age 67) Village Head Faqirian, Malikwal Tehsil, Mandi Bahauddin District, Punjab, Pakistan
- Education: Government High School, Mona, Mandi Bahauddin (elementary); Government Degree College, Bhalwal (FA); Government Degree College, Sargodha (BA); Federal Law College, Islamabad (LLB)

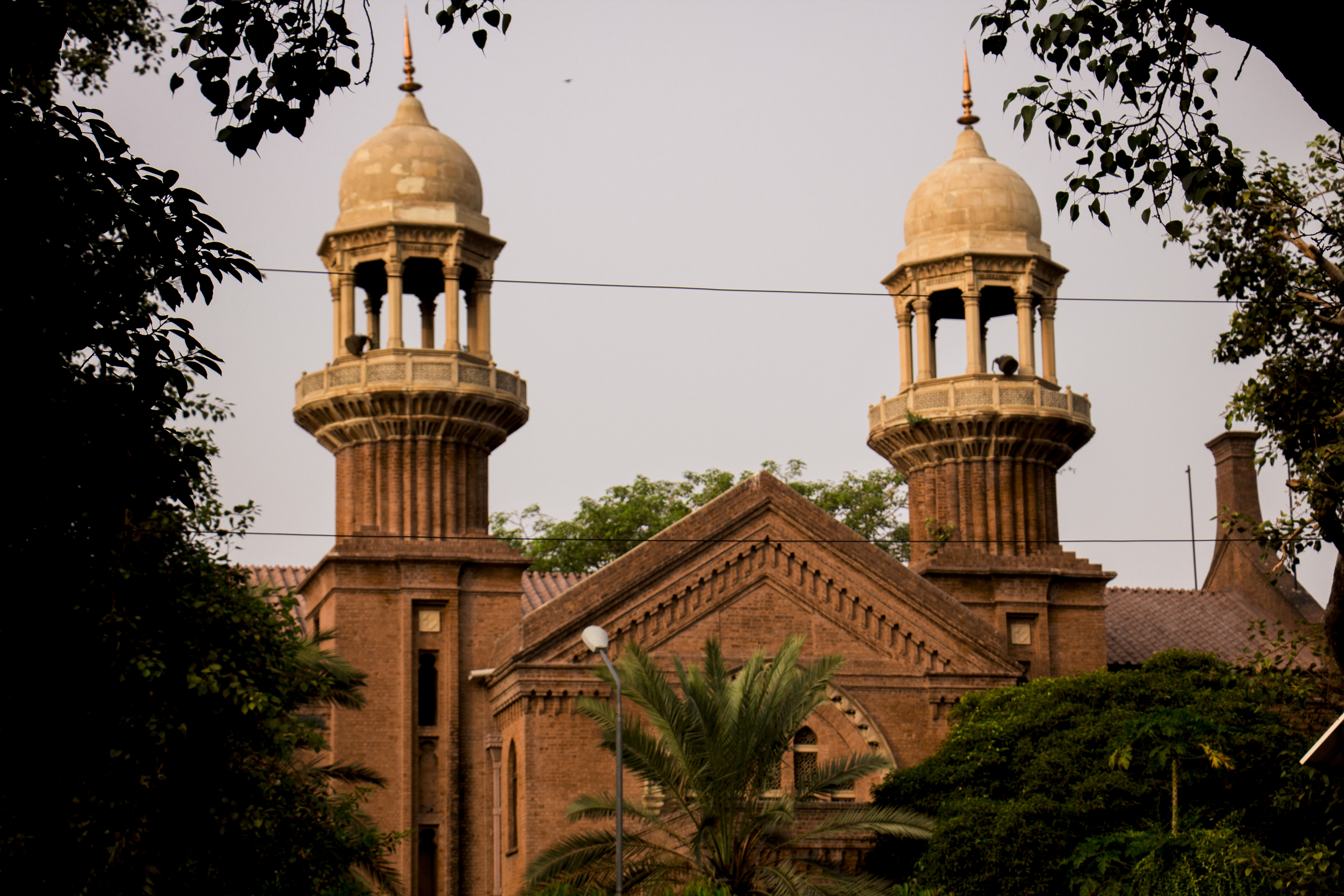
Lahore High Court

Chaudhry Mushtaq Ahmed (born 7 April 1959) is a Pakistani jurist who has been a judge of the Lahore High Court since 7 November 2014.

== Early life and education ==
Ahmed was born on 7 April 1959 in village of Head Faqirian in Malikwal Tehsil of Mandi Bahauddin District located in Punjab province of Pakistan. Ahmed attended Government High School in village Mona, located in Mandi Bahaudduin district, passing his matriculation exam. In 1976, he gained his Fellow of Arts degree from Government Degree College located in Bhalwal. For Bachelor of Arts, he attended Government Degree College in Sargodha and got his degree in 1978. In 1984, he got his LLB from Federal Law College located in Islamabad, an institution affiliated with University of the Punjab.

== Judicial career ==
In 1985, he started legal practice as an advocate and became member of Rawalpindi's District Bar Association. In 1987, he started practicing as an advocate in the high court and continued as a lawyer until 1998. On 2 January 1999, he was elevated to an Additional District and Sessions Judge (AD&SJ) post in Multan. After Multan, he had dispensed his duties as AD&SJ in Okara, Dipalpur, Sargodha, and Narowal. In February 2007, he became District and Sessions Judge (D&SJ) and remained Special Judge for anti-corruption in Bahawalpur for three years then he was transferred to Rajanpur as D&SJ. Then, he was posted as Special Judge for Anti-Terrorism Court Number 1 in Gujranwala, then again as D&SJ in Toba Tek Singh. Lastly, he was serving as D&SJ in Nankana Sahib when on 7 November 2014, he was elevated to Lahore High Court as a judge.

== Notable decisions ==
In an unprecedented decision on 24 December 2019, Ahmed issued the bail to Rana Sanaullah who was arrested by Anti Narcotics Force (ANF), a body associated with Pakistani military and headed by active duty military officers. ANF officers claimed that they recovered 15 kilograms of heroin from Sanaullah. Possession of over 10 kilograms of heroin carries a death penalty in Pakistan and is considered a non-bailable offence. Ahmed issued his detailed judgement in this case on 26 December 2019.

In the detailed judgement, Ahmed noted the reasons for granting the bail to Sanaullah, he noted that accused accomplices of Sanaullah were granted bail by the trial court while Sanaullah was not granted the same. He noted that ANF did not file an appeal in Lahore High Court for cancellation of the bail to accused accomplices of Sanaullah. Ahmed also noted that ANF did not request the physical remand of Sanaullah for further investigation into the matter. He also noted the possible "political victimization" for Sanaullah's arrest as he belonged to the opposition Pakistan Muslim League (N) and was very vocal in criticism of Pakistan Tehreek-e-Insaf-led government. Ahmed also noted that there was no recovery memo prepared by ANF at the time of recovery.
