= Kirtowal =

Coordinates: 32.573386°N 73.278481°E

Kirtowal is a small village in Malakwal Tehsil, Mandi Bahauddin District, Punjab, Pakistan. The village is located around 225 kilometers south-east of the capital city Islamabad and around 25 kilometers from its district headquarters Mandi Bahauddin. It has a moderate climate, which is hot in summer and cold in winter. During peak summer, the day temperature rises to 40°C, but the winter months are comparatively pleasant, with the temperature going down to 2°C only in the months of December and January. The village is located on the bank of Lower Jhelum Canal. Its population is around 2,000. People of this area are hardworking. The land is very fertile and many of the people's major source of income is farming. It covers an area of approximately 3 square kilometers. In this area, wheat, rice, and sugar cane are the major crops. The most popular game in this village is volleyball, and youngsters also enjoy playing cricket. This village has two government model primary schools, one for boys and one for girls. Many parents also send their children to private schools of nearby villages.

https://web.archive.org/web/20160204080110/http://www.mbdin.net/index.php/tehsil-malakwal/216-kirtowal-malakwal.html
