= Busal =

بوسال
- Village
- Bosal
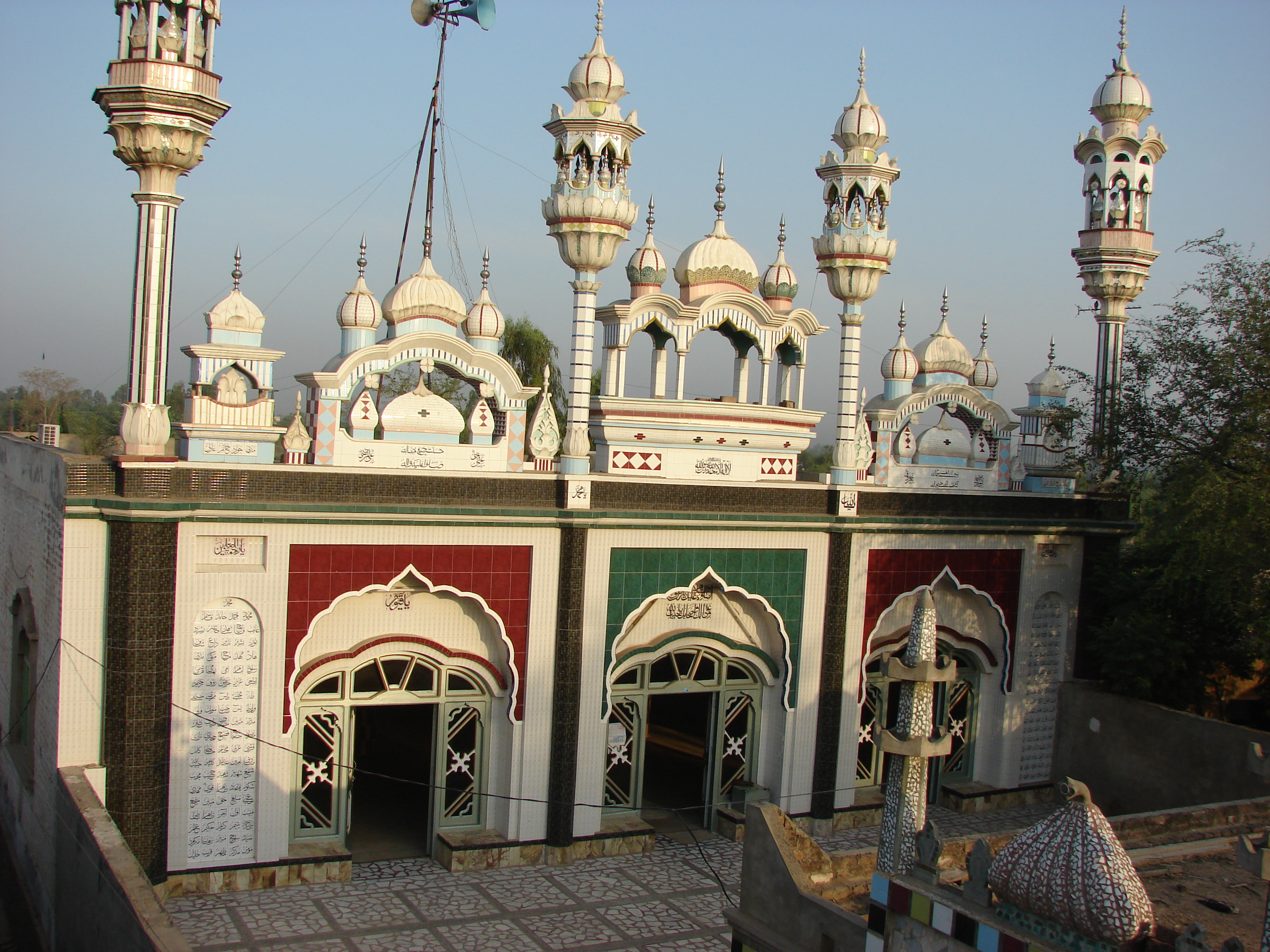
- A mosque in Busal

- Location within Pakistan
- Coordinates: 32.22°N 73.18°E
- Country: Pakistan
- Province: Punjab
- District: Mandi Bahauddin District
- Tehsil: Malakwal
- Elevation: 202 m (663 ft)

Population (2017)
  - Total: 22,181
- Time zone: UTC+5 (PST)

Busal or Bosal (Urdu: بوسال) is a village in Mandi Bahauddin District, Punjab, Pakistan. It is one of the larger settlements of Tehsil Malakwal and lies between the Jhelum and Chenab rivers in the Jech Doab region.

== History ==
The origins of Busal trace back several centuries, with local accounts suggesting that the settlement was founded during the reign of the Mughal Emperor Akbar (1542–1605). The area later developed into an agricultural and political hub due to its fertile land and proximity to irrigation canals established during the British colonial period.

== Education ==
Busal hosts several educational institutions, including the Government Higher Secondary School (established 1905) and the Government Associate College for Women Busal Sukkha (established 2015). These institutions have contributed to improving literacy in the area.

== Religion ==
The majority of the population in Busal are Muslims, with both Sunni and Shia communities present. Several shrines, including that of Mian Muhammad Panah and Syed Masoom Ali Shah, are located in the village.
