= Bhagowal (District Sialkot) =

Coordinates: 32°26′15.8″N 74°40′14.4″E

Bhagowal, Sialkot بھاگووال
- Interactive map of Bhagowal, Sialkot
- Country: Pakistan
- Province: Punjab
- District: Sialkot

Population
  - Estimate (2020): ~12,000
- Time zone: UTC+5 (PST)
- Calling code: 0523

Bhagowal (Urdu: بھاگووال) is a village situated along the Sialkot–Zafarwal road in Sialkot District of the Punjab province in Pakistan. The village is situated about 30 km east of Sialkot.
