= Muhammad Amin Ul Hasnat Shah =

Pakistani politician

- محمدامین الحسنات شاہ

Minister of State for Religious Affairs and Interfaith Harmony
- In office 4 August 2017 – 31 May 2018
- President: Mamnoon Hussain
- Prime Minister: Shahid Khaqan Abbasi
- Succeeded by: Mohammad Yousuf Shaikh
- In office 8 June 2013 – 28 July 2017
- President: Mamnoon Hussain
- Prime Minister: Nawaz Sharif

Personal details
- Born: 11 December 1952 (age 73)
- Party: PTI (2023-present)
- Other political affiliations: PMLN (2017-2023)
- Parent: Justice Shaykh Muhammad Karam Shah al-Azhari (father)

Muhammad Amin Ul Hasnat Shah (Urdu: محمد امین الحسنات شاہ; born 11 December 1952) is the Custodian of Hazrat Amir us Salikeen RA, Bhera, Pakistan. Shah is the chancellor of Al Karam International Institute and Dar ul Uloom Muhammadia Ghousiya. He is a former Minister of State for Religious Affairs and Interfaith Harmony, in Abbasi cabinet from August 2017 to May 2018. Previously he served as the Minister of State of Religious Affairs and Interfaith Harmony from 2013 to 2017 in third Sharif ministry. He was a member of National Assembly of Pakistan from June 2013 to May 2018.

== Early and personal life ==
Pir Muhammad Amin Ul Hasnat Shah was born on 11 December 1952. He is the son of Justice Shaykh Muhammad Karam Shah al-Azhari, a Sunni Barelvi leader and author of the famous Tafsir Zia ul Quran. He is a graduate from Ummul Qurra University, Makkah, Saudi Arabia.

His eldest son is Naeem Ud-din Shah, who is a law (LLB Hons) graduate from the University of Essex and the chairman of Zia ul Ummah Foundation.

== Political career ==
Shah was elected to National Assembly of Pakistan as a candidate of Pakistan Muslim League (N) from Constituency NA-64 (Sargodha-I) in the 2013 Pakistani general election.

In June 2013, he was made the minister of state of Religious Affairs and Inter-faith Harmony. He had ceased to hold ministerial office in July 2017 when the federal cabinet was disbanded following the resignation of Prime Minister Nawaz Sharif after Panama Papers case decision.

Following the election of Shahid Khaqan Abbasi as Prime Minister of Pakistan in August 2017, he was inducted into the federal cabinet of Abbasi. He was the Minister of State for Religious Affairs and Interfaith Harmony until the expiration of the term of the National Assembly 31 May 2018.

Pir Muhammad Amin Ul Hasnat Shah joined the Pakistan Tehreek-e-Insaf (PTI) on 21 January 2023 in a press conference in his hometown of Bhera.
