= Jamia Mosque, Bhera =

Mosque in Bhera, Punjab, Pakistan

- جامع مسجد بھیرہ
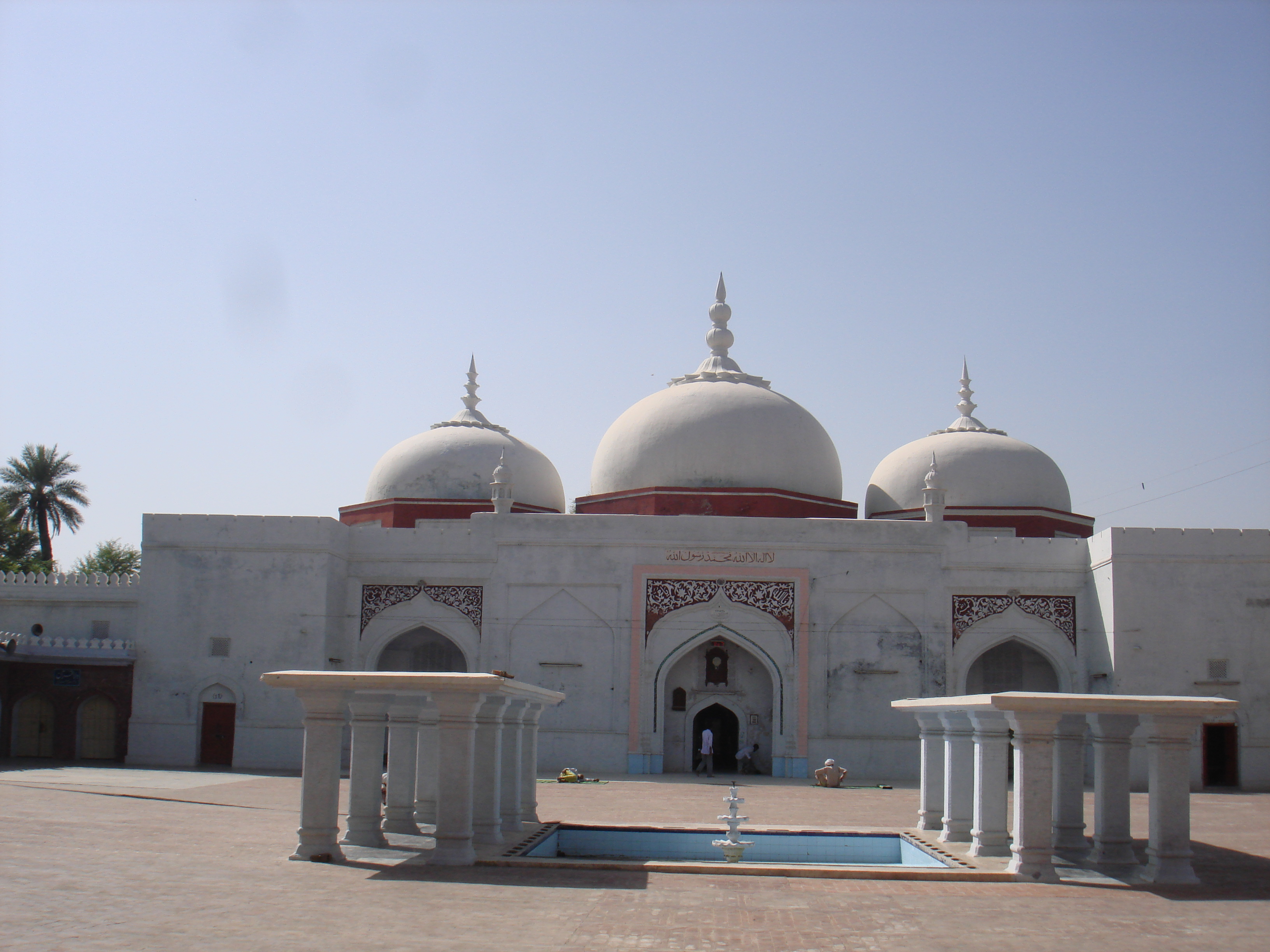
- Mosque in 2007

Religion
- Affiliation: Islam
- Ecclesiastical or organizational status: Mosque
- Status: Active

Location
- Location: Bhera, Punjab
- Country: Pakistan

Architecture
- Type: Mosque architecture
- Groundbreaking: 1540

Specifications
- Dome: Three
- Minaret: Two

The Jamia Masjid, also known as Sher Shahi Masjid (Urdu: مسجد شیر شاہ; Punjabi: شیر شائی مسیت) and Masjid Bugviyah (Punjabi: بگویہ مسیت), is a historic 16th century mosque in Bhera, Punjab, Pakistan.

== Location ==
The Jamia masjid is located 4 km from Bhera interchange on Motorway M2, in the mohalla Boariwalla at the southern end of Walled City of Bhera.

== History ==
The inscription plate on the entrance of the mosque dates its construction to 1540 CE, during the reign of Sher Shah Suri, who is traditionally accredited to have constructed the mosque, although there is no direct evidence of it. During the Sikh period the mosque suffered some damage owing to its usage as a stable. The mosque was restored to the Muslims in the British colonial period. It was extensively renovated in 1860 by Qazi Ahmad-ud-Din Bugvi, a local dignitary and scholar. The renovation was continued until the mid 20th century by the Bugviyah family.

== Layout ==
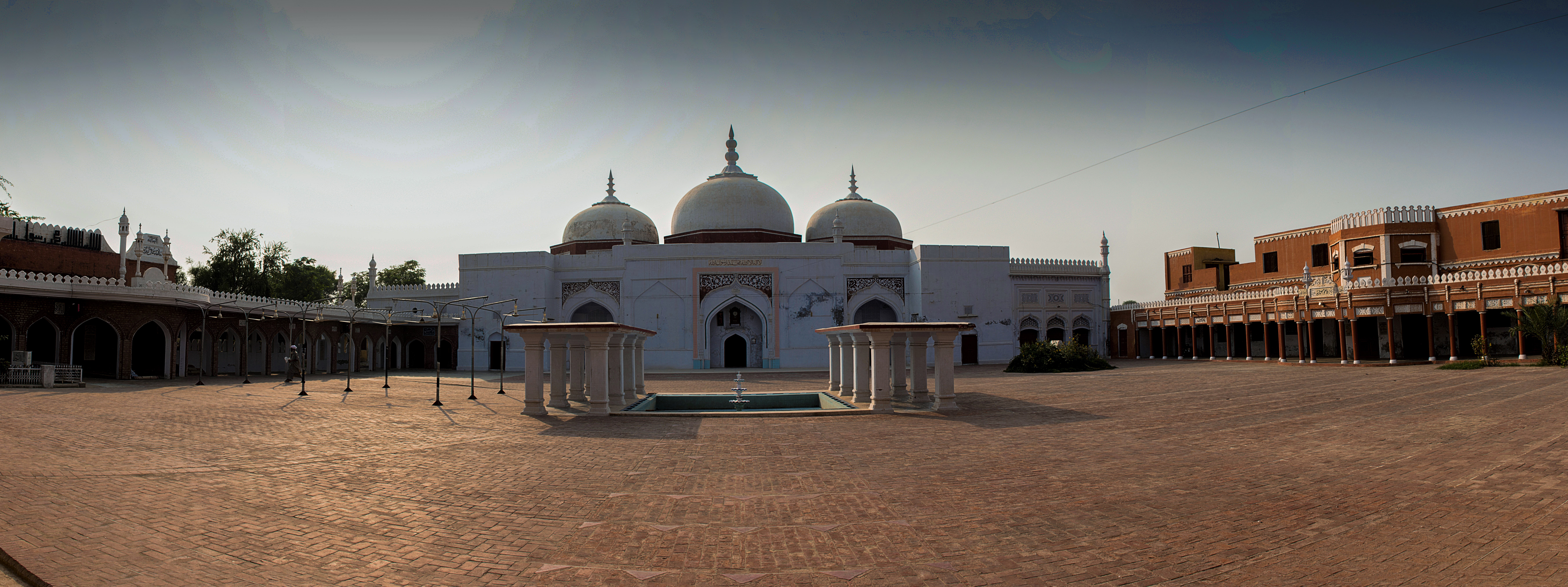
The view of the mosque across the courtyard.

The mosque covers an area of 44.75 kanals, and has three onion-shaped domes and two minarets. In the courtyard there is a 12 × 12 sq. ft water tank for ablution. There are two chambers on either side of the main sanctuary for the lessons of Qur'an and Hadith. The total area of the courtyard is 162 × 144 sq. ft. There is a small library located besides the mosque, containing several manuscripts dating to the Mughal period.
