= Corporate sector of Pakistan =

The Corporate sector of Pakistan (otherwise attributed as the Corporatization; or/ simply referred to as the Pakistan Inc.) is an elite business sector expanded in financial cities of Pakistan, and a policy measure programme in the economic period of Pakistan. This programme is also regarded as "Pakistan Inc.", which is a common term used by the mass-media of Pakistan to refer to the corporate sector of the nation. The current policy measure programme is the Companies Ordinance 2016 that legally allows a variety of formations in the mixed economy of Pakistan.

The programme was originally based on the Indian Companies Act, 1913, which was replaced by the Companies Ordinance 1984, finally being replaced by the current Companies Ordinance 2016 in a vision to promote a Western-styled corporate sector, and business activities development in Pakistan. The corporate sector came in direct response to nationalization programme of executed Prime Minister Zulfiqar Ali Bhutto and the Pakistan Peoples Party to promote corporate business. This programme was integrated in Privatization programme of Prime Minister Nawaz Sharif in 1990 who gave a free hand to the private sector to expand the economic activities in the country. The corporate sector continued to expand in Prime Minister Benazir Bhutto's government who promoted the nationalization and privatization at once. In 2004, in a programme initiated by Prime Minister Shaukat Aziz, the corporate sector further enhanced and matured; it had built a strong and sizeable sector in the financial hubs of the country.

Under Aziz, many of state-owned megacorporations along with private sector had been registered in stock exchanges of the country in order to promote business competition in the country.

== Growth trend ==
The Securities and Exchange Commission of Pakistan has registered 920 new companies in the first quarter of 2005. The Company Registration Office at Lahore registered the most number of companies at 324, CRO Karachi 285 companies, and CRO Islamabad 211 companies.

Of the 920 companies, 898 were limited by shares comprising 21 public unlisted companies, 840 private companies, and 37 single member companies. In addition, the commission also registered 11 foreign companies, 9 associations not-for-profit and 2 companies limited by guarantee. Total authorized capital and paid up capital of the companies limited by shares amounted to Rs.50 billion and Rs.2 billion, respectively.

The services sector recorded 161 new incorporations, followed by 121 in trading, 64 in Information Technology, 59 in communication, 50 in fuel and energy, 49 in the real estate development, 38 in construction and 37 in textile sector. The SECP encourages and facilitates corporatisation of all businesses so that the corporate sector contributes towards the economic development of the country.

In July 2025, Microsoft announced the closure of its limited operations in Pakistan after 25 years, citing global restructuring and a shift to a partner-led, cloud-first model. The decision, part of a broader layoff of over 9,000 employees worldwide, was seen by analysts as a troubling signal of declining investor confidence and operational challenges in Pakistan. Stakeholders noted that the move reflects growing concerns among multinational corporations over security, regulatory instability, and the overall business environment in the country.

As of 2005, the Board of Investment estimates that there were 43,965 corporate enterprises registered in Pakistan as detailed below:

Companies Incorporated	43,618	Financial Services Companies	244	Insurance Companies	56	Banking Companies	47
Private companies limited by share	39,628	Modaraba companies	64	Local general insurance companies	48		
Public non-listed companies	2,214	Investment advisors	57	Local life insurance companies	3		
Public listed companies	687	Modarabas	47	Foreign general insurance companies	3		
Foreign companies	643	Close-end mutual funds	37	Foreign life insurance companies	2		
Welfare organisations and associations	357	Leasing companies	30				
Trade companies limited by guarantee	83	Asset management companies	4				
Unlimited companies	6	Open-end mutual funds	3				
		Credit rating companies	2				

== Issues ==
Economic instability, including currency depreciation, declining foreign investment, and a volatile regulatory climate, has created a difficult landscape for global firms. Over 55 local startups either shut down or pivoted between 2021-2024, while tech funding dropped by 88% between 2022 and 2024. Issues such as poor internet infrastructure, frequent power outages, and political uncertainty have also contributed to an exodus of skilled professionals and companies alike. These developments have raised concerns about Pakistan's ability to attract and retain multinational firms across various sectors.

== See also ==
- Board of Investment
- Securities and Exchange Commission of Pakistan
- Karachi Stock Exchange
- List of Pakistani companies
- Islam in Pakistan

== Documentation ==
- E-Govt., Electronic Government. "The Companies Ordnance Act, 1984" (PDF). Security and Exchange Commission. Government of Pakistan. Archived from the original (PDF) on 10 May 2012.
