= Bukkan, Mandi Bahauddin =

Pakistani village

Bukkan
- Village
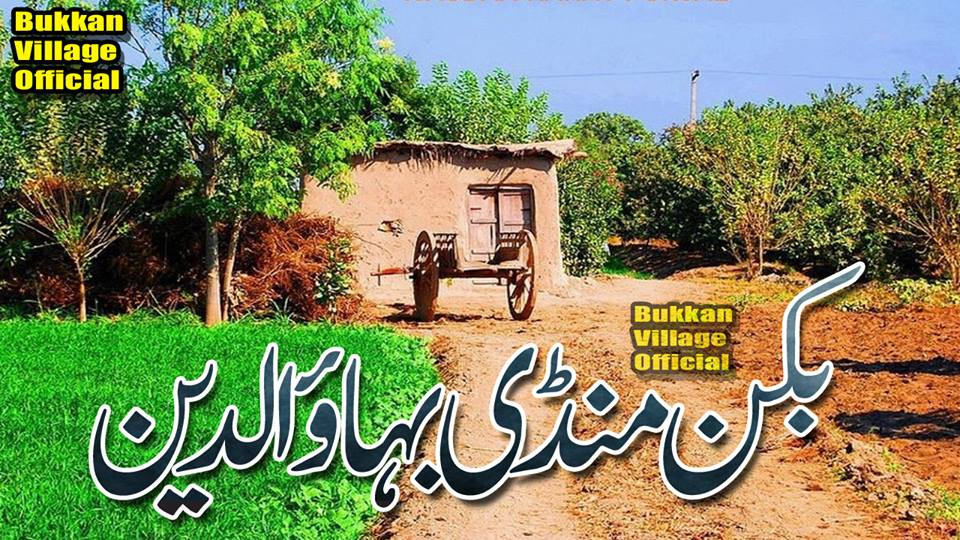
- Animated wallpaper of Bukkan

- Location in Pakistan
- Coordinates: 32°34′N 73°28′E
- Country: Pakistan
- Province: Punjab
- District: Mandi Bahauddin
- Time zone: UTC+5 (PST)

Bukkan, Mandi Bahauddin is a village in Malakwal Tehsil of Mandi Bahauddin District in Punjab, Pakistan.

== Overview ==
=== Location ===
Bukkan is located on Sargodha-Gujrat road. It is about 25 km from Mandi Bahauddin and about 22 kilometers from Malakwal.

=== Postal Code and Union Council ===
The zip-code of village is 50481. The Union Council of the village is UC-66 Khai.

=== Main Clans and Population ===
The main clans are Chadhar, Ghega, Gondal, Bhatti, Tarkhan, Mughal, Shaikh Kumhar, Machi, Mochi, and Punjuthe. The total population of village is about 13,000 whereas the number of registered voters is about 13000 to 15000.

=== Literacy Rate ===
The literacy rate of the village is very low. Most of the people are illiterate. According to a research held locally, more than 70 percent of the total population is illiterate. There are also a few schools in the village from which the well known school is Government Abbas High School Bukkan. There is also a Government Girls high school in the village and a few private schools.

=== Land / Crops ===
The village has alluvial land which is best for growing crops. Oranges, rice, wheat, and sugar cane are major crops grown there.
