= Karam Shah al-Azhari =

Pakistani judge and scholar (1918–1998)

Muhammad Karam Shah al-Azhari
- محمد کرم شاہ الأزھری
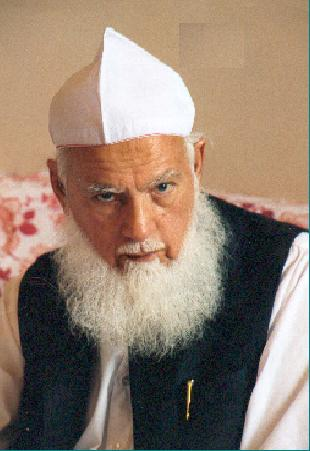
- Born: Muhammad Karam Shah; 1 July 1918; Bhera (currently Pakistan)
- Died: 7 April 1998 (aged 79); Islamabad, Pakistan
- Education: Al-Azhar University
- Children: Shaykh Muhammad Amin al-Hasanat Shah, Hafeez Ul Barkat Shah, Major Ibrahim Shah, Mohsin Shah, Abulhassan Shah Al-Azhari, Farooq Bahawal Haq Shah

Muhammad Karam Shah al-Azhari (1 July 1918 – 7 April 1998) was a Pakistani Islamic scholar of Hanafi jurisprudence, Sufi, and Muslim leader. He is known for his work Tafsir Zia ul Quran fi Tafsir ul Quran, (Transl. The light of the Quran in the Exegesis of the Quran) commonly referred to as Zia ul Quran. He also wrote Zia un Nabi, a biography of Muhammad in seven volumes.

He was a spiritual guide of the Chishtiyya Sufi order.

== Early life and career ==
Muhammad Karam Shah was born on 1 July 1918 at Bhera, Sargodha District, British India. He finished his basic education in his hometown Bhera in 1936. Then he learned Persian and Arabic languages. Then on the advice of Khwaja Qamar ul Din Sialvi (1906 – 1981), he went to Muradabad, in 1942 for the study of hadith. He graduated from the University of the Punjab in 1945 and then went on to Egypt for higher religious education at Al-Azhar University. He received his master's degree in Islamic Law.

He wrote "Zia un Nabi", a 1995 Urdu biography of Muhammad. in seven volumes. It was translated into English by Muhammad Qayyum Awan. He wrote Tafsir Zia ul Quran, an Urdu interpretation of the Quran in 5 volumes.

He reorganised the Islamic institution Dar al-Uloom Muhammadiyyah Ghausiyyah established by his grandfather in Bhera (Sargodha), and brought major changes in the syllabus of religious education. He was of the view that modern education should be learned alongside religious education.

Shah al-Azhari was an active participant in the Pakistan movement and vigorously campaigned in the Indian provincial elections, 1946 for All India Muslim League.

He also served as a justice on the Supreme Court of Pakistan until his death in 1998 and had served on its Shariat Bench. He became a justice of the Federal Shariat Court when it was first established in 1981.

== Bibliography ==
- Tafsir Zia ul Quran (1995) (in five volumes)
- Zia un Nabi (1995) (a biography of Muhammad in seven volumes)

== Awards and recognition ==
- Sitara-e-Imtiaz (Star of Excellence) by the Government of Pakistan
- Pakistan Post issued a commemorative postage stamp to honor him in its 'Men of Letters' stamp series (2004)

== Death ==
Shah al-Azhari died on 7 April 1998 after being ill for nearly a year.
