= Pesh-kabz =

Type of Indo-Persian knife

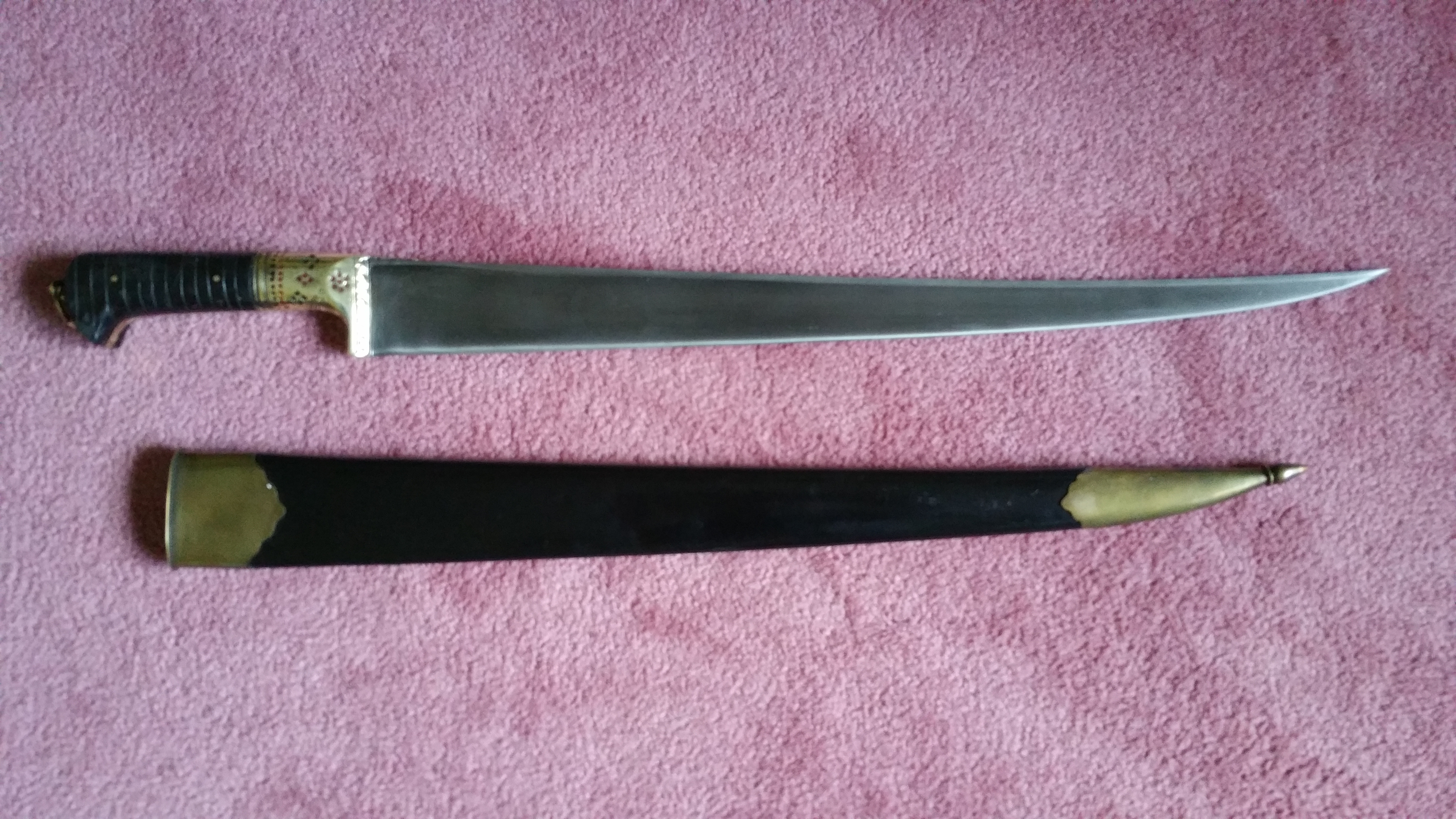
Modern pesh-qabz with scabbard made in India. Blade: steel; hilt: buffalo horn and brass.

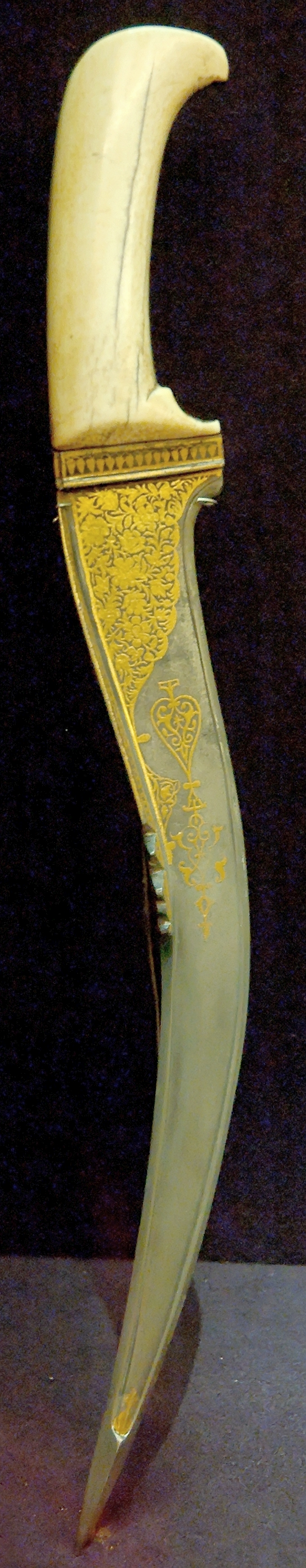
Pesh-qabz, 18th century. Blade: gilt steel; hilt: gilt ivory or bone, Louvre Museum, Paris, France.

The pesh-qabz or peshqabz (Persian: پیش قبض, Hindi: पेश क़ब्ज़) is a type of Indo-Persian knife designed to penetrate mail armour and other types of armour. The word is also spelled pesh-qabz or pish-ghabz and means "fore-grip" in the Persian language; it was borrowed into the Hindustani language. Originally created during Safavid Persia, it became widespread in Central Asia and the Indian subcontinent during the Mughal period.

== Design ==
Most pesh-qabz use a hollow-ground, tempered steel single-edged full tang, recurved blade with a thick spine bearing a "T" cross-section for strength and rigidity. In most examples, a pair of handle scales are fixed to the full-tang grip, which features a hooked butt. The earliest forms of this knife featured a recurved blade, suggestive of its Persian origin. In all variants the blade is invariably broad at the hilt, but tapers progressively and radically to a needle-like, triangular tip. Upon striking a coat of mail, this reinforced tip spreads the chain link apart, enabling the rest of the blade to penetrate the armour. One knife authority concluded that the pesh-qabz "as a piece of engineering design could hardly be improved upon for the purpose".

The knife is typically used as a thrusting weapon also held upside down in hand with the thumb on the bottom of the handle. However, the wide hollow-ground blade also possesses considerable slicing performance, and as such may also be used effectively with slashing or cutting strokes. Its ability to be used as either a cutting or thrusting weapon has caused more than one authority to erroneously classify the pesh-qabz as a fighting dagger.

Pesh-qabz are typically around 40–46 cm (16-18 inches) in overall length, with blades of approximately 28–33 cm (11-13 inches). When compared to other similar knives with T-section blades and reinforced tips, the pesh-qabz is virtually indistinguishable, save for its length of blade. The kard or bahbudi (antiq.) has a longer blade (though still shorter than an Afghan sword such as the salwar yatagan) and is considered a separate design, while the chura, used by the Mahsud clan of the Pashtun Khyber tribe, is a slightly shorter version of the pesh-qabz.

The pesh-qabz has a full tang and is traditionally fitted with walrus (دندان ماهی dandān māhi) ivory scales or handles, but other examples have been found using ivory from the tusks of the rhinoceros, or elephant. Still other knives may be found with scales of wood, agate, jasper, rock crystal, horn, serpentine (false jade), or metal. The sheaths are typically constructed of metal or leather over wood, and may be inset with silver or precious stones.

== History ==
The pesh-qabz originated in Safavid Persia and is believed to have been created sometime in the 17th century to overcome the mail armor worn by mounted and foot soldiers of the day. The term itself was first used to describe the front of a girdle worn by Persian wrestlers, indicating that the pesh-qabz was worn centrally as opposed to the kard and other blades which were worn at the sides. It soon spread to neighbouring Afghanistan and Central Asia before eventually being introduced to the Indian subcontinent by the Mughals. After armor ceased to be worn by modern armies, the pesh-qabz retained its utility as a close combat knife, and many Pashtun tribesmen, particularly the Mahsud, Afridi, and Shinwari clans, continued to use the design, along with the chura and kard.

During their period of colonial rule in India, the British frequently referred to all Afghan blades of this pattern collectively as "Afghan knives" or "Khyber knives", after the Khyber Pass that marked the transition from British India to the nation of Afghanistan. In India, manufacture of the pesh-qabz was centered in the northern city of Bhera, now part of Pakistan. In the present-day, a number of pesh-kabz are manufactured in Udaipur, India.

The pesh-qabz is still used today as a personal weapon as well as a ceremonial badge of adulthood for Pashtun and other Afghan hill tribes.

During World War 1, on 17 January 1916, the Maharaja of Patiala ordered a modernized version of the traditional knife fit for the use in modern war from the Wilkinson Sword Company. This exemplar combined a straight blade of the classic form with the hilt of a Lee-Enfield bayonet. Only 555 pieces were manufactured and none of these seems to have survived though there is a detailed sketch from the producers' archives.

== See also ==
Yataghan
