= Bhera =

Town in Punjab, Pakistan

Bhera بھیرا
- City
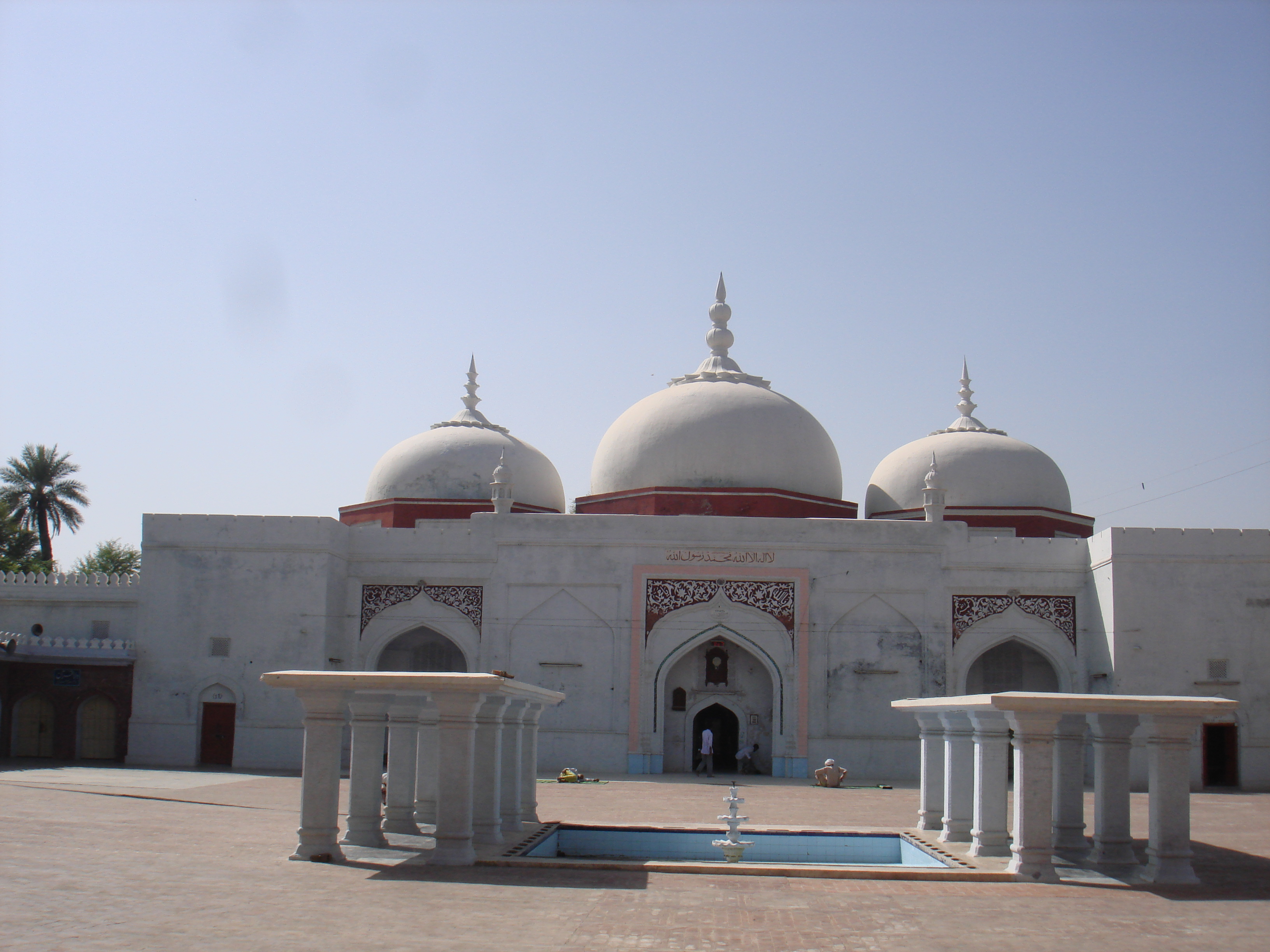
- Jamia Mosque, 1540

- Location of Bhera Bhera (Pakistan)
- Coordinates: 32°28′52″N 72°54′25″E
- Country: Pakistan
- Province: (Punjab, Pakistan) Punjab
- District: Sargodha

Population (2023 census)
  - Total: 70,921
- Time zone: UTC+5 (PKT)

Bhera (Punjabi: بھیرا; Urdu: بھیرہ) is a city and tehsil of Sargodha District in Punjab province of Pakistan. The city is known for wood-carved items, textiles (such as quilts and khussas), and certain desserts (such as pheni and patisa).

The city comprises the walled old town and the surrounding newer development. The old town is surrounded by high walls with eight gates, and is divided into mohallas, or neighborhoods; historically, different castes lived in different mohallas. The Jhelum River flows to the north of Bhera.

== History ==
According to Ancient Geography of India by Alexander Cunningham, Bhera was once known as Jobnathnagar.

The Imperial Gazetteer of India records the history of Bhera as follows:

In the seventh and eighth centuries, the Salt Range chieftain was a tributary of Hindu Shahi (rulers of Lahore). Bhera was sacked by Mahmūd of Ghazni, and again two centuries later by the generals of Chingiz Khān. In 1519 Bābar held it to ransom; and in 1540 Sher Shāh founded a new town, which under Akbar became the headquarters of one of the subdivisions of the Sūbah of Lahore. In the reign of Muhammad Shāh, Rājā Salāmat Rai, a Khukhrain of the Anand tribe, administered Bhera and the surrounding country; while Khushāb was managed by Nawāb Ahmadyār Khān, and the south-eastern tract along the Chenāb formed part of the territories under the charge of Mahārājā Kaura Mal, governor of Multān.

About the same time, by the death of Nawāb Ahmdyār Khan, Khushāb also passed into the hands of Rājā Salāmat Rai. Shortly afterwards Abbās Khān a Khattak who held Pind Dādan Khān, treacherously put the Rājā to death, and seized Bhera. But Abbās Khān was himself thrown into prison as a revenue defaulter, and Fateh Anand, nephew of Salāmat Rai then recovered his uncle's dominions.

In the recent past centuries, Bhera was an important trading outpost on the road to Kabul, and boasted of a taksal (mint) during the rule of Ranjit Singh. The city was known for its knife and cutlery craftsmen, who made fighting daggers (Pesh-kabz) as well as hunting knives and table cutlery, often fitted with handles of serpentine (false jade) or horn. Sir Robert Baden-Powell described the process by which craftsmen manufactured gem-quality serpentine aka false jade from ores obtained from Afghanistan: "The sang-i-yesham (ore) is cut by means of an iron saw, and water mixed with red sand and pounded (with) kurand (corundum). It is polished by application to the san (polishing wheel), wetted with water only, then by being kept wet with water, and rubbed with a piece of wati (smooth pottery fragment), and lastly by rubbing very finely pounded burnt sang-i-yesham on it. This last process must be done very thoroughly."

Bhera is the setting of the novel Mayyadas Ki Mari (Mayyadas's Castle), by Indian playwright Bhisham Singh Sahni.

== Demographics ==
Population

Historical population
Year	Pop.	±%
1972	24,167	—
1981	29,654	+22.7%
1998	31,618	+6.6%
2017	40,320	+27.5%
2023	70,921	+75.9%

According to official 2023 census results, the population of Bhera city is 70,921. increased from 40,320 in 2017 census.

== Notable people ==
- Sukh Jiwan Mal, raja of Kashmir (1754–1762)
- Karam Shah al-Azhari, ex-Justice Supreme Court of Pakistan; Islamic scholar
- Amarnath Vidyalankar, Indian politician and social worker
- Balraj Sahni, Bollywood actor and writer
- Birbal Sahni, paleobotanist
- Ehsan-ul-Haq Piracha, Finance Minister of Pakistan, (1988–1990)
- J.C. Anand, film producer, distributor, founded Eveready Pictures of Pakistan
- Bashir A. Tahir, international banker
- Neelo, Pakistani film actress
- Sikandar Sultan Raja, Chief Election Commissioner of Pakistan since January 2020
- Inam ul Haq Piracha, Ex-District Nazim and MNA National Assembly of Pakistan
- Muhammad Amin Ul Hasnat Shah, politician, Minister of State for Religious Affairs (2017–2018)
