= Sialkot–Zafarwal road =

Road in Pakistan

Coordinates: 32°29′53.5″N 74°33′57.2″E

Sialkot–Zafarwal Road
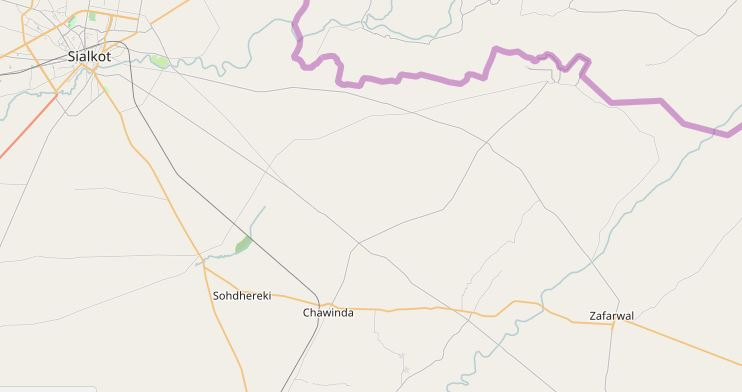

Major junctions
- From: Sialkot
- To: Zafarwal

Location
- Country: Pakistan

Highway system
- Roads in Pakistan

The Sialkot–Zafarwal Road is a dual highway connecting the cities of Sialkot and Zafarwal in the Punjab province of Pakistan.
