= Tafsir Zia ul Quran =

Quranic exegesis by Muhammad Karam Shah al-Azhari

- Author: Muhammad Karam Shah al-Azhari
- Original title: ضیاء القرآن
- Language: Urdu
- Subject: Quranic exegesis
- Genre: Islamic theology
- Publisher: Zia Ul Quran Publishers
- Publication date: 1979
- Publication place: Pakistan
- Media type: Print
- Pages: 5 volumes

Tafsir Zia ul Quran is a Quranic exegesis (tafsir) written by Muhammad Karam Shah al-Azhari (1918–1998). He was a Sunni scholar specialized in the Hanafi fiqh. He also belonged to the Chishti Sufi order. The tafsir has been published in 5 volumes.

== Title ==
Mostly the names of Islamic texts are kept in Arabic, even if the text is in a non Arabic language. Following this de facto rule, Muhammad Karam Shah al-Azhari named his book, as Diya ul Quran fi Tafsir ul Quran meaning “The light of the Quran in the Exegesis of the Quran”, commonly referred to as Diya ul Quran or Zia ul Quran.

== See also ==
- Zia un Nabi (1995) (a biography of Muhammad in seven volumes)
