= Bhaguwal =

- Village
- Location in Punjab, India Bhaguwal (India)
- Coordinates: 31.416782°N 75.207064°E
- Country: India
- State: Punjab
- District: Kapurthala

Government
  - Type: Panchayati raj (India)
  - Body: Gram panchayat

Population (2011)
  - Total: 575
- Sex ratio 292/283♂/♀

Languages
  - Official: Punjabi
  - Other spoken: Hindi
- Time zone: UTC+5:30 (IST)
- PIN: 144804
- Telephone code: 01822
- ISO 3166 code: IN-PB
- Vehicle registration: PB-09
- Website: kapurthala.gov.in

Bhaguwal is a village in Kapurthala district of Punjab State, India. It is located 22 kilometres (14 mi) from Kapurthala, which is both district and sub-district headquarters of Bhaguwal. The village is administrated by a Sarpanch, who is an elected representative.

== Demography ==
According to the report published by Census India in 2011, Bhaguwal has a total number of 103 houses and population of 575 of which include 292 males and 283 females. Literacy rate of Bhaguwal is 56.43%, lower than state average of 75.84%. The population of children under the age of 6 years is 93 which is 16.17% of total population of Bhaguwal, and child sex ratio is approximately 1214, higher than state average of 846.

== Population data ==
| Particulars | Total | Male | Female |
|---|---|---|---|
| Total No. of Houses | 103 | - | - |
| Population | 575 | 292 | 283 |
| Child (0–6) | 93 | 42 | 51 |
| Schedule Caste | 575 | 292 | 283 |
| Schedule Tribe | 0 | 0 | 0 |
| Literacy | 56.43 % | 66.80 % | 45.26 % |
| Total Workers | 179 | 167 | 12 |
| Main Worker | 179 | 0 | 0 |
| Marginal Worker | 0 | 0 | 0 |

== Air travel connectivity ==
The closest airport to the village is Sri Guru Ram Dass Jee International Airport.
