= Bhagowal Khurd =

Bhagowal Khurd بھاگووال خورد
- Village
- Location within Punjab, Pakistan Location within Pakistan
- Country: Pakistan
- Province: Punjab
- District: Gujrat
- Time zone: UTC+5 (PST)
- Calling code: 053

Bhagowal Khurd (Urdu: بھاگووال خورد) is a village in the district of Gujrat, Punjab, Pakistan. It is located to the south of Jalalpur Jattan. It is largest village in his UC.
