= Ehsan-ul-Haq Piracha =

Pakistani politician (1932–2019)

Ehsan-ul-Haq Piracha (1932 – 2019) was a Pakistani politician.

== Early life ==
He was from the town of Bhera in Sargodha District, Punjab, Pakistan.

== Career ==
He was elected as a member of the Punjab Assembly in 1970 and 1977, serving as the minister for communication and works in the provincial cabinet until the imposition of martial law in July 1977.

Piracha also served as the president of the Rawalpindi-Islamabad Chamber of Commerce and Industries. In 1985, he was elected as a senator against a technocrat seat, a position he held until 1988. Subsequently, Piracha was elected to the National Assembly in 1988 and 1990.

From 4 December 1988 to 6 December 1990, Piracha served as the state minister for finance in the cabinet of Prime Minister Benazir Bhutto. In this role, he was responsible for overseeing the country's economic policies during his tenure. In 1989, a Pakistani high court judge investigated the authorization of a new stock exchange, Islamabad Stock Exchange. The judge's findings revealed that the Piracha had helped approve the deal, which exclusively favored a company with which he had previously served as a director. Additionally, a member of the minister's family was a director at the same company at the time of the deal's approval. The judge presiding over the case issued a strongly worded opinion, alleging that the finance minister had engaged in improper dealings related to the authorization of the new stock exchange.

Prior to the 2013 general elections, Piracha and his family joined the Pakistan Tehreek-i-Insaf (PTI) political party.

== Death ==
Ehsan-ul-Haq Piracha died in Islamabad on 1 February 2019.
