= Bhagowal Kalan =

Village in Punjab, Pakistan

Coordinates: 32°41′07.8″N 74°19′17.5″E

Bhagowal Kalan بھاگووال کلاں
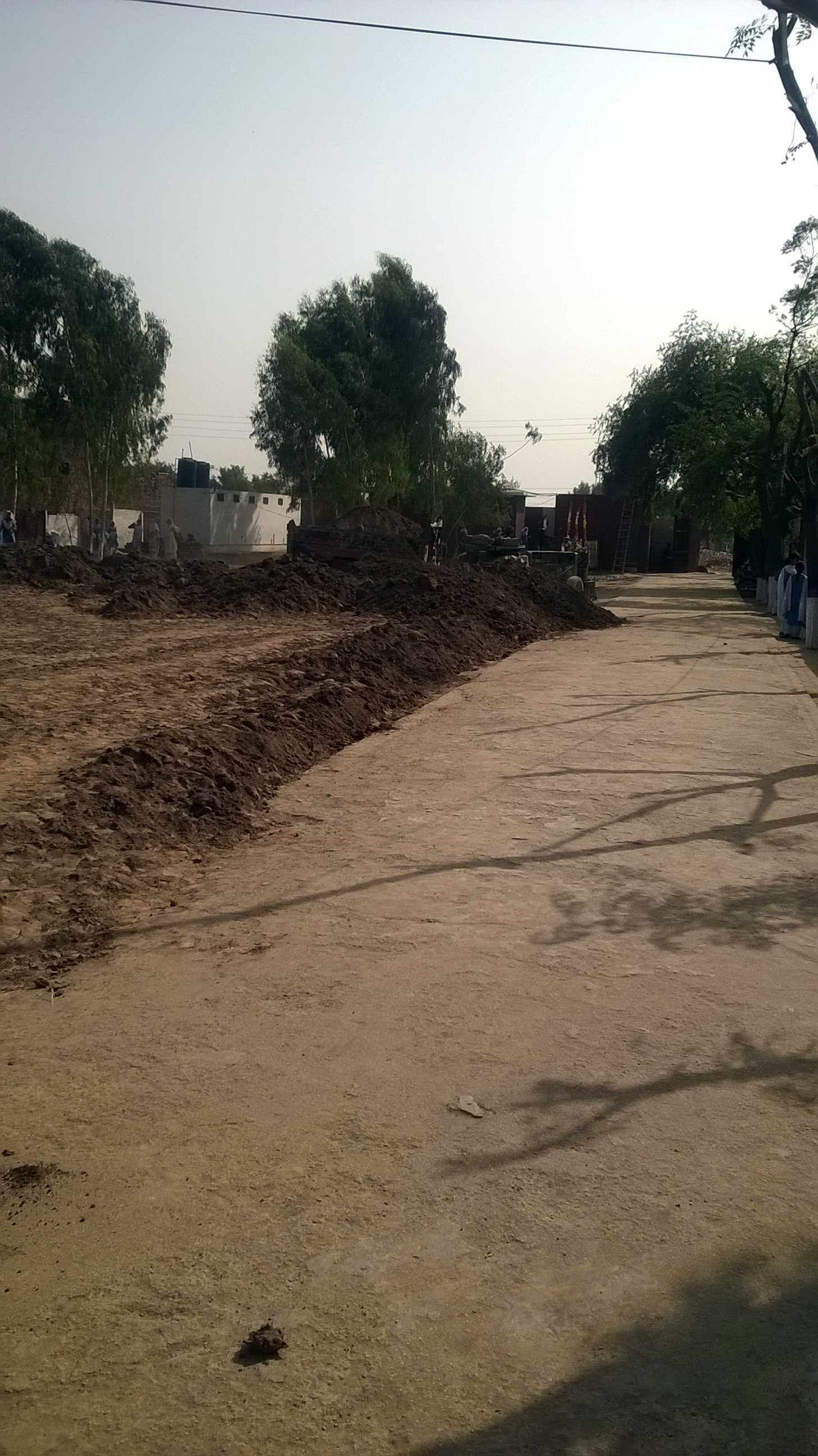
- A view from the village

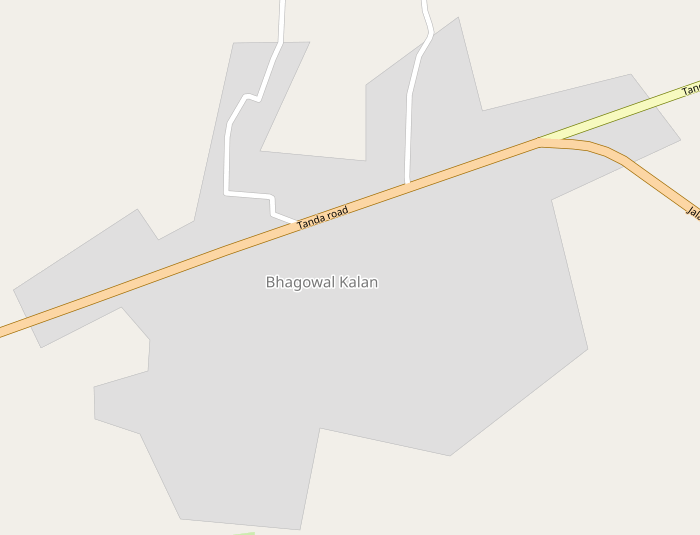
- Map of Bhagowal Kalan
- Country: Pakistan
- Province: Punjab
- District: Gujrat
- Time zone: UTC+5 (PST)
- Calling code: 053

Bhagowal Kalan (Urdu: بھاگووال کلاں) is a village located along Tanda Road in Gujrat District, Punjab, Pakistan. It was the head of Jagir state ruled by Kahlon Jats.
