= Constituency PP-120 (Mandi Bahauddin-V) =

Former constituency of the Punjabi Provincial Legislature, Pakistan

PP-120 (Mandi Bahauddin-V)
- Former constituency for the Provincial Assembly of Punjab

Former constituency
- Abolished: 2018

PP-120 (Mandi Bahauddin-V) was a Constituency of Provincial Assembly of Punjab. It was abolished after 2018 Delimitations after 2017 Census of Pakistan.

== General elections 2013 ==
Provincial election 2013: PP-120 Mandi Bahauddin-V
Party	Candidate	Votes	%	±%
PML(N)	Sayed Muhammad Mahfooz Mashedi	19,529	23.02	
Independent	Arshad Mahmood	13,084	15.42	
PML(Q)	Muhammad Arif Gondal Chhimmoana	12,007	14.15	
PPP	Ahmad Bakhash	10,101	11.90	
PTI	Ch. Asad Ayaz Gondal	8,676	10.22	
SIC	Muhammad Ammar Saeed	6,094	7.18	
Independent	Zia Ullah Ranjha	5,668	6.68	
Independent	Tariq Mahmood Alloana	2,476	2.92	
APML	Ijaz Ahmad Gondal	2,270	2.68	
TTP	Ijaz Ahmad	1,809	2.13	
JUI (F)	Muhammad Asad Ullah	1,069	1.26	
Others	Others (seven candidates)	2,071	2.44	
Turnout		87,729	53.93	
Total valid votes		84,854	96.72	
Rejected ballots		2,875	3.28	
Majority		6,445	7.60	
Registered electors		162,670		

== General elections 2008 ==
Contesting candidates	Party affiliation	Votes polled

== See also ==
- Punjab, Pakistan
