= Nazar Muhammad Gondal =

Pakistani politician

Ch. Nazar Muhammad Gondal
- Born: 15 April 1950 (age 76); Bukkan, Mandi Bahauddin, Pakistan
- Education: Punjab University Lahore
- Occupations: Federal Minister for Food, Agriculture, and Narcotics.
- Children: 6
- Relatives: Zafar Iqbal Gondal (sibling), Major(R) Zulfiqar Ali Gondal (sibling)

Ch. Nazar Muhammad Gondal (born 15 April 1950) is a Pakistani politician, a former Federal Minister for Capital Administration & Development. He received his bachelor's degree in Legislation and Law (LL.B). Gondal joined PTI (Pakistan Tehrik.e.Insaf) on 6 June 2017. He also served as head of Pakistan Badminton Association and as head of other public offices.

== Political career ==
He has been elected 5 times as a Member of the National assembly. He was politically affiliated with Pakistan Tehreek-e-Insaf (PTI). Former minister Nazar Muhammad Gondal quits PTI over the 9 May riots. He is a lawyer and a farmer by profession. He was appointed as Parliamentary Secretary for Establishment Division. Nazar Muhammad Gondal was also elected as the Nazim of Mandi Bahauddin District from 2001 to 2004. He won the 18 February general elections from NA-109, Mandi Bahaudin-II on ticket of PPPP. He was victorious over Pakistan Muslim League candidate Nasir Iqbal Bosal.

Gondal also serves as the president of the Pakistan Badminton Federation, which was suspended by the Badminton World Federation over claims by two parallel formed federations run by Nazar Mohammad Gondal and Mian Iftikhar Hussain Shah. Gondal also has served as Food and Agriculture Minister from 2010 to 2013 and Minister of Narcotics from 2008 to 2010. Gondal won the elections for three consecutive five-year terms 1993-1996, 2002, and 2008. Gondal's brother won the seat against Pervaiz Elahi (former CM Punjab).

== Sources ==
- http://www.pakistanherald.com/Profile/Nazar-Muhammad-Gondal-211
