= Islamabad Stock Exchange =

Stock exchange located in Islamabad, Pakistan

- اسلام آباد بورس
- Type: Stock exchange
- Location: Islamabad, Pakistan
- Founded: 1989
- Closed: January 11, 2016 (merged with Pakistan Stock Exchange)
- Owner: Public Limited Company Owned By Members
- Key people: Mian Ayyaz Afzal, Managing Director
- Currency: PKR
- No. of listings: 261
- Indices: ISE 10 Index; ISE Network Index
- Website: www.ise.com.pk

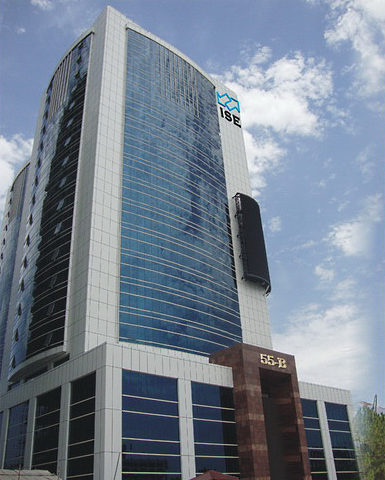
ISE Towers in Islamabad

The Islamabad Stock Exchange (Urdu: اسلام آباد بورس or PSX-ISE) was a stock exchange located in Islamabad, Capital Territory, Pakistan. In 2016, it merged with the Pakistan Stock Exchange.

== History ==
Islamabad Stock Exchange was incorporated as a guarantee-limited company on 25 October 1989 in Islamabad. In 1989, a Pakistani high court judge investigated the authorization of a new stock exchange in Islamabad. The judge's findings revealed that the Ehsan-ul-Haq Piracha, then Minister of State for Finance, had helped approve the deal, which exclusively favored a company with which he had previously served as a director. Additionally, a member of his family held a directorship at the same company at the time of the deal's approval. The judge presiding over the case issued a strongly worded opinion, alleging that the finance minister had engaged in improper dealings related to the authorization of the new stock exchange.

It was licensed as a stock exchange on 7 January 1992. It started trading in July 1992. ISE has been corporatized and demutualized on August 26, 2015 in terms of Stock Exchanges (Corporatization, Demutualization and Integration) Act, 2012. As a consequence thereof, its name has been changed as Islamabad Stock Exchange Limited. With effect from January 11, 2016 the Islamabad Stock Exchange was integrated with the Karachi Stock Exchange Limited under the Stock Exchanges (Corporatisation, Demutualization and Integration) Act, 2012 to form the Pakistan Stock Exchange.

== Trading system ==
Initially, an outcry method of trading (a method of trading that uses verbal bids and offers in the trading pits) in shares was adopted which was replaced with the automated trading system (a computerized system for matching orders in securities) commonly called “ISE-CTS” in 1997. In the year 2002, ISECTS gave way to “ULTRA TRADE” trading system which is not only very efficient but also has extended trading capacity, internet trading functionality. The computerized trading system has brought about much needed transparency in the securities trading. It has been designed in such a way to provide automatic matching of bids and offers for execution purpose. All orders are treated in strict price and time priority, thus ensuring a pure auction market where no order is overlooked or traded through. In this manner, the best trade is executed and passed on to the participants without human interference. Printed confirmation and status messages are immediately received by a member for each of his order. Remote Trading or Internet Trading has been implemented in ISE on 23 June 2003. Now Brokers can trade from anywhere in the world using remote trading software of ISE with the same robustness as working on the LAN.

== Unified trading system ==
Islamabad Stock Exchange joined hands with Lahore Stock Exchange on 30 April 2007 to establish a Unified Trading Platform to help in bringing increased liquidity in the market, improving price discovery, maximizing transparency, increasing turnover, broadening investor base, curtailing risks and distortions in trade, providing cost effective service to the investing public and enhancing the image of both the Exchanges.

== Indexes ==
On 1 January 2004, ISE launched its own capital weighted index which is ISE-10 index with a base date of December 31, 2002 and a value of 1000. Before its launch ISE was using index of KSE-100. ISE also has a price weighted index called ISE Network Index which was launched in November 1996.

== ISE Tower ==
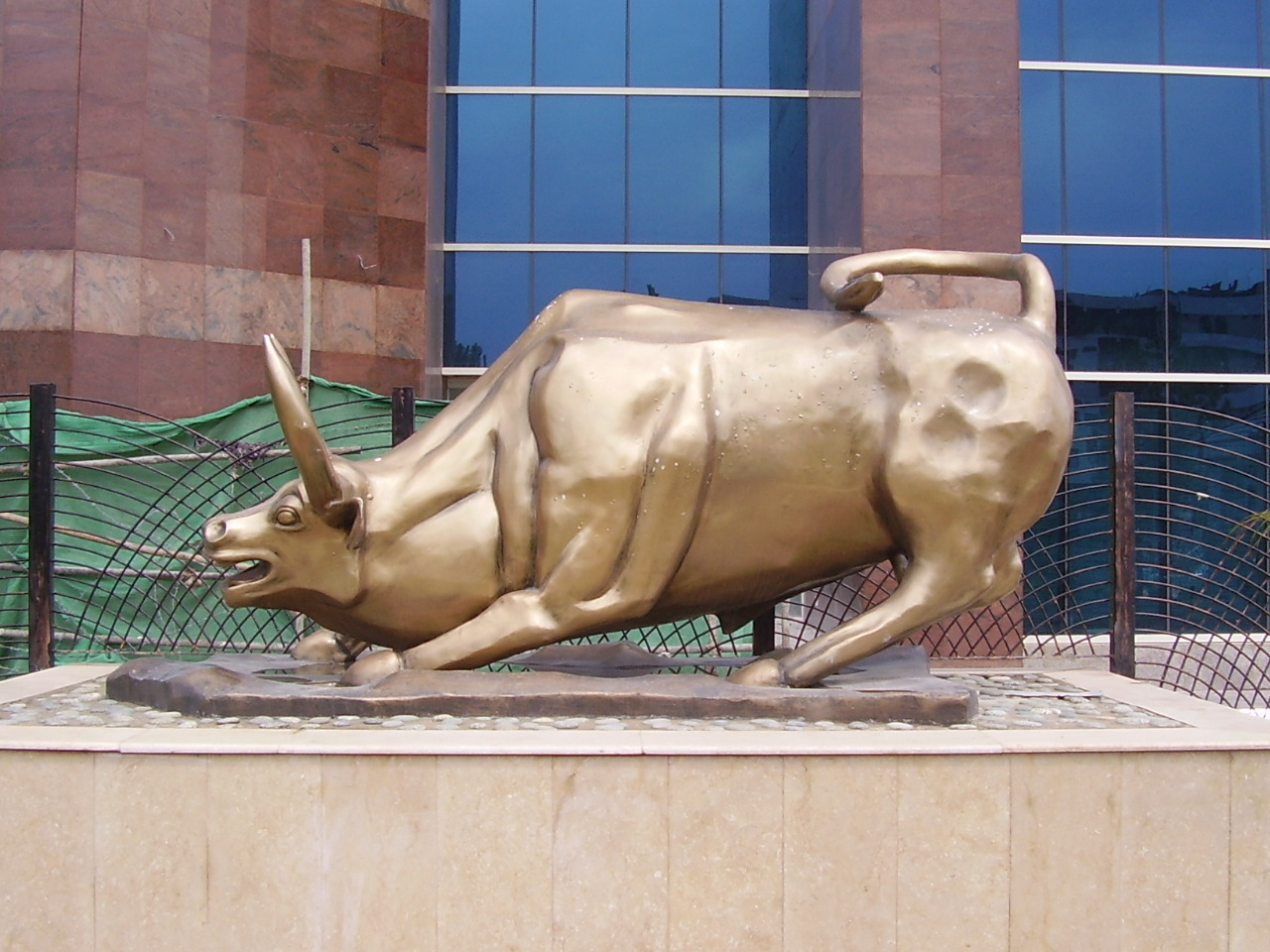
Islamabad Stock Exchange Bull

ISE tower is a 22-storey building, which makes it the second highest building of Islamabad after the Telecom Tower. Area covered by the building is 52,269.9 m^{2} (562,629 sq ft), it consists of three levels of basements and ground plus 18 floors above. Basements have capacity to accommodate three hundred cars at a time. The building also accommodates a plant room for latest HVAC system requirements. Ground floor is allocated for meeting the requirements of banks. Each floor is covered by 6 passenger lifts and one cargo lift along with three stairwells. A central cooling and heating system is provided in the building. It was inaugurated by Prime Minister Syed Yousuf Raza Gilani on 31 July 2009.

== See also ==
- List of Asian stock exchanges
- Borsa Istanbul
