= Pheni =

Type of vermicelli from Indian subcontinent

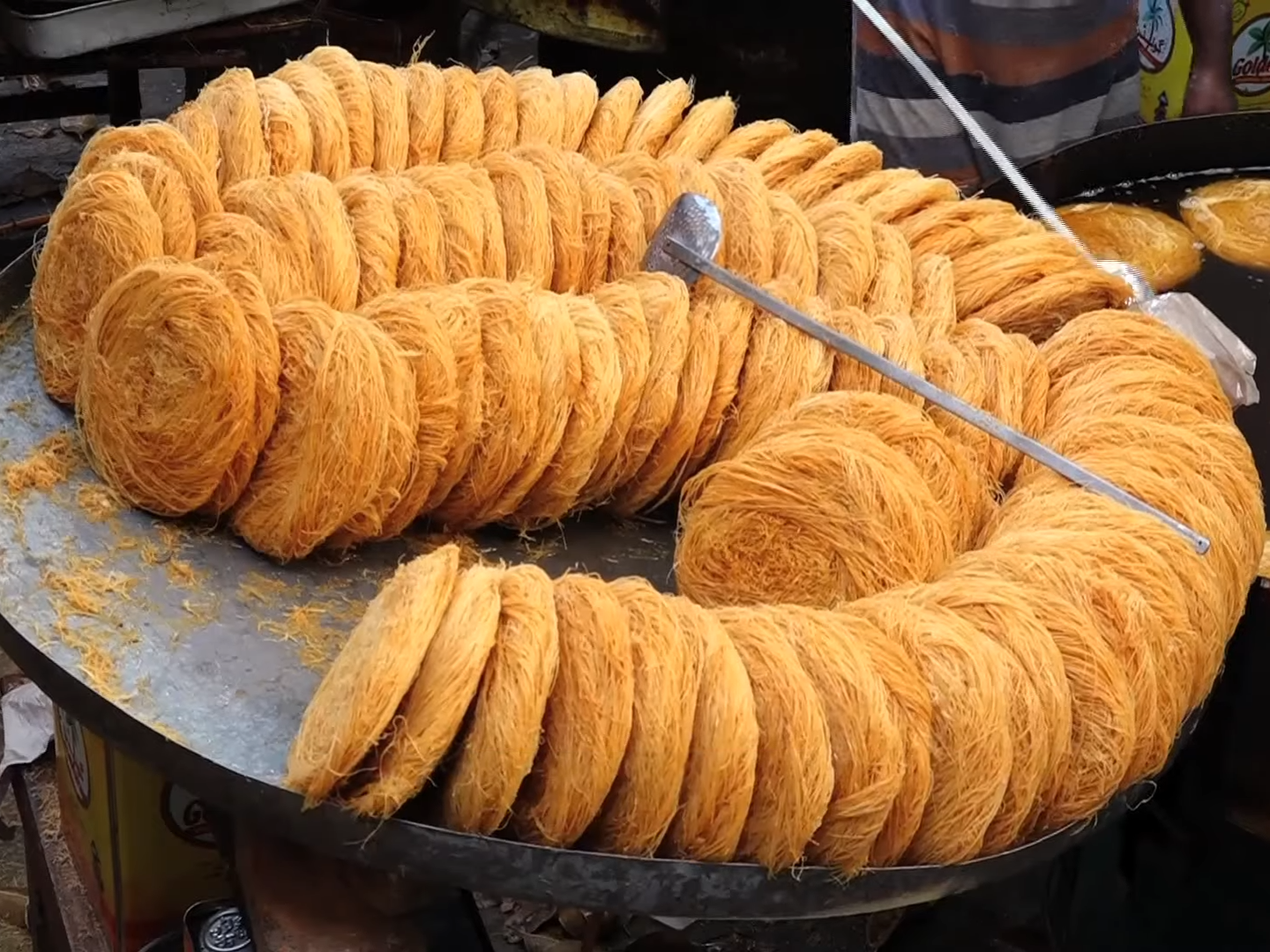
- Pheni in a market in Rawalpindi, Pakistan
- Alternative names: Fenia
- Place of origin: Rajasthan
- Region or state: Indian subcontinent
- Main ingredients: Semolina; Flour
- Variations: Sutarfeni; Khajla

Pheni or fenia is a form of vermicelli from the Indian subcontinent. Although similar to seviyan, pheni uses finer noodles. Pheni is ritually used for the Karva Chauth festival, which is celebrated in parts of India, where it is one of the dishes on the traditional platter sargi thali and is consumed just before the fast associated with the festival begins.

Similar dishes include khajla and sutarfeni; latter of these originates from Rajasthan. Since khajla and pheni are used as traditional foods for Ramadan in different cities of Pakistan, therefore, its preparation creates job opportunities for additional labour, and the trade for multiple grain industries rises.

== Etymology ==
The term sutarfeni is a combination of two words; sutar means thread and feni means fine. The food's name pheni is derived from phenaka, which is defined in Sanskrit dictionary as "a kind of pastry", and included various kinds of layered fried doughs.

== Preparation and serving ==
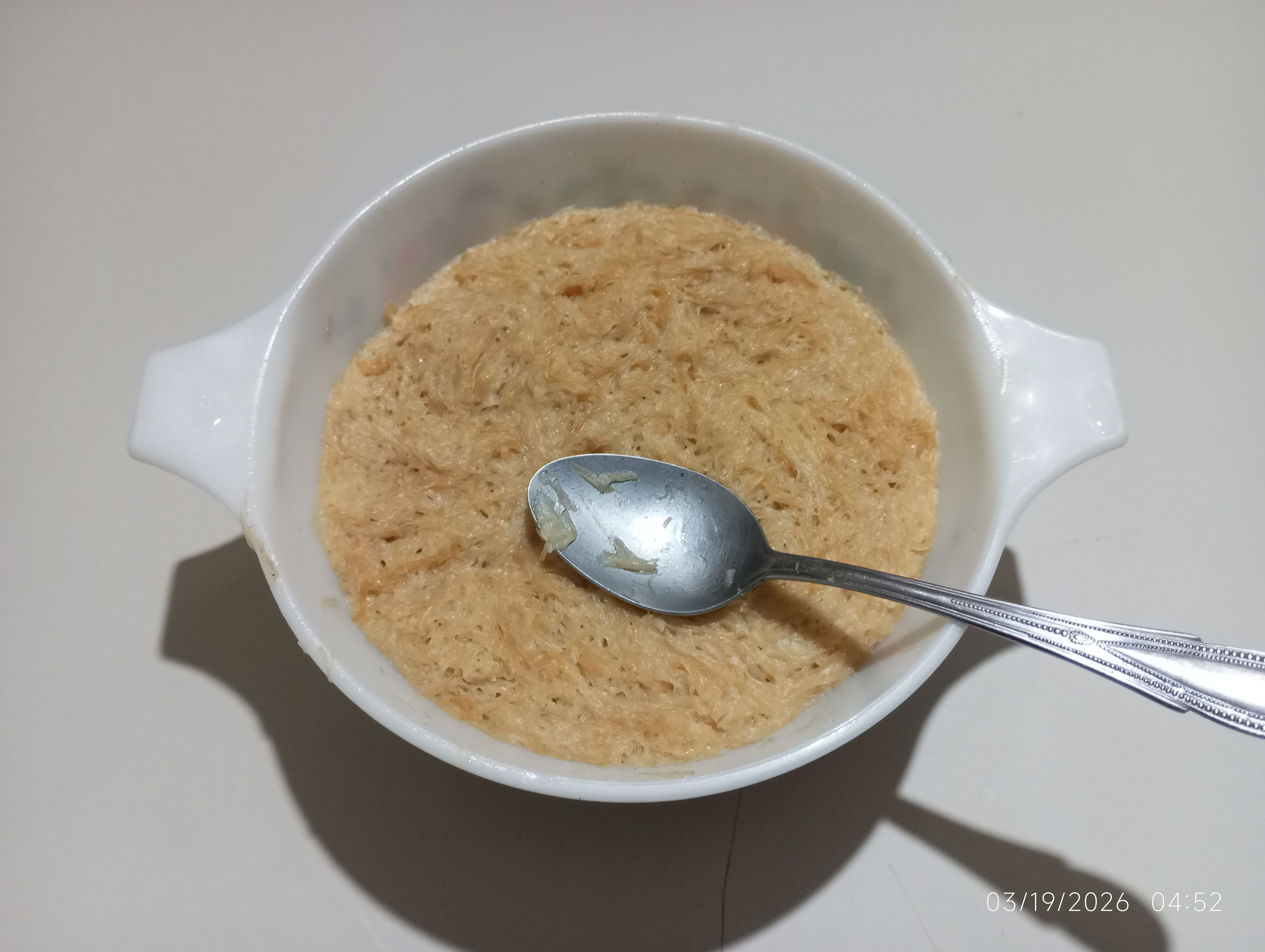
From stretching the dough into multiple layers (left) to a serving of pheni with milk (right)

The basic ingredient of pheni is semolina or flour, from which a dough is made using either ghee or vegetable oil, depending upon the quality – as with any other vermicelli. The difference lies in the processing: when the dough is converted into small balls, the artisan stretches these into layers. Ghee is applied and the layer is rolled back to rest for a while. The process is repeated until multiple finely thin layers are formed, while ghee prevents each layer fusing together. It is then transformed into a finely threaded flatbread, which is then deep fried until a roasted color appears. After draining the excess oil, pheni is ready to be served with milk because it has the ability to soak up the liquid. (Note: Pieces of information gathered from multiple sources, such as VOA Urdu, BBC Urdu, Arab News, Dawn, and Express News, all based in Pakistan, while People of India Maharashtra, a book, and Her Zindagi, both based in India.)

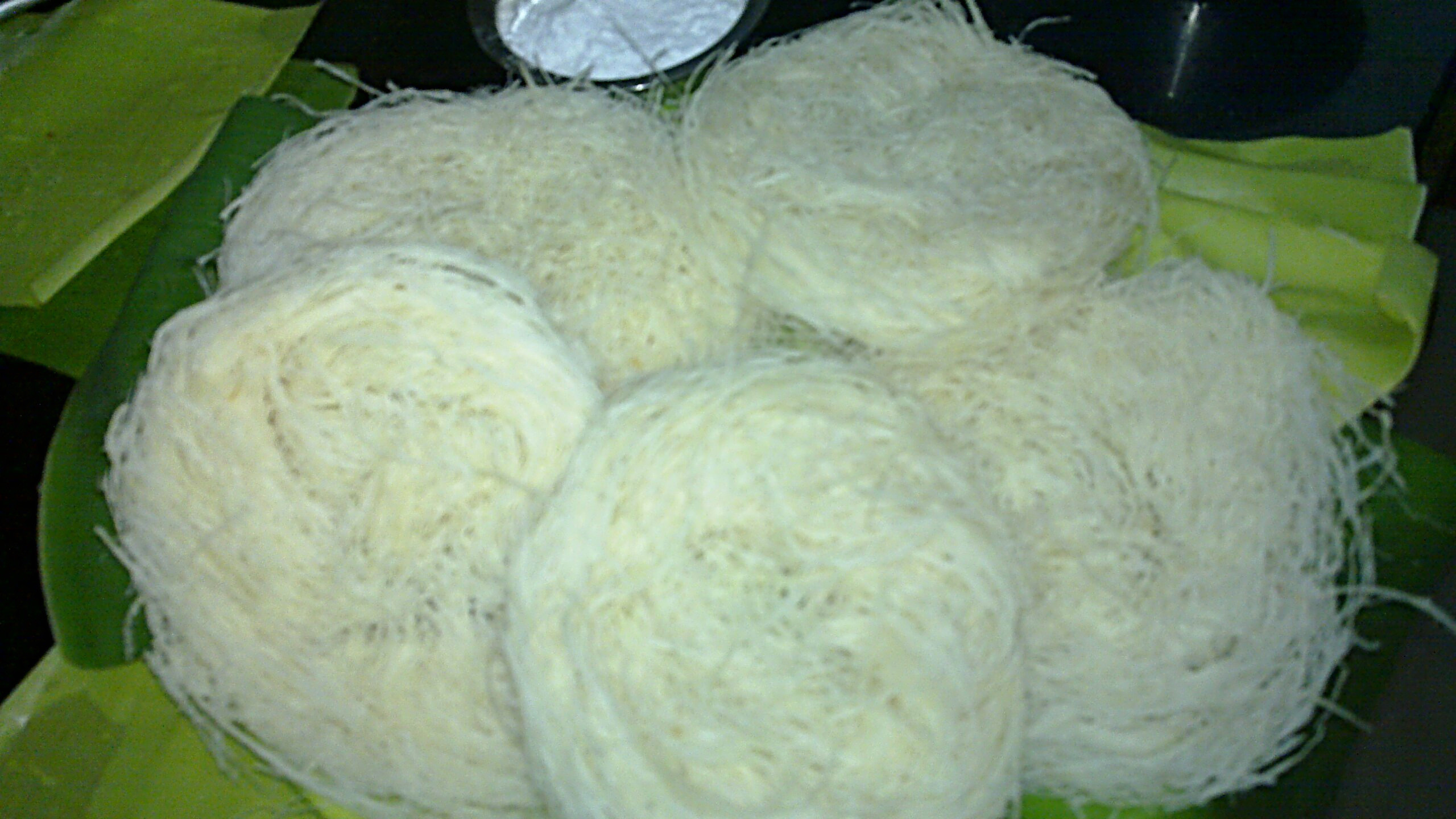
Sutarfeni in a market in Karnataka, India

Alternately, dishes like suterfeni and khajla can be prepared which are similar to pheni but have a slight difference in how they are processed. Suterfeni is a kind of pheni which originates from Rajasthan, but it is served as a ready-made sweet dish, that resembles a bird's nest, in which additional flavours and scents can be added by using either honey, saffron, rose water, or similar. Khajla, however, is also served with milk just like pheni during Ramadan, but it is prepared by deep frying the flatbreads directly without making threads out of the dough balls, until they are roasted and expanded. (Note: Pieces of information are gathered from multiple sources, such as The Locavore Cadbury Desserts Corner, and BBC News Gujarati from India, and Dawn, Express News, and Chef Afzal, all based in Pakistan.)

Pheni with milk is served for fasting traditions in the Indian subcontinent. Hindu families use this during the occasion of Karva Chauth, celebrated in Northern and Western India, as one of the dishes while preparing their sargi thali, a traditional platter which is presented by mother-in-law to the daughter-in-law. Muslim families prepare khajla and pheni with milk during suhur particularly in the month of Ramadan. It may be served with various sweet items, as well as dry fruits (whether garnished or provided separately).

In different states of India, pheni with milk is also prepared and served along with the other traditional dishes eaten during Dhanteras for the occasion of Diwali, and as a winter delight during the festival of Makar Sankranti.

== Surveys ==
According to surveys by different publishers, pheni is usually prepared for traditional purposes, for which the bakers hire additional staff under the artisan. A local shop can stock and store it at a normal temperature for weeks without damage, and can sell up to a ton per day. In Pakistan, preparation of khajla and pheni boosts the trade of the flour, ghee, and sugar industries during the month of Ramadan. (Note: Pieces of information gathered from multiple sources, such as News Meter from India, and Dawn, Express News, Arab News, and VOA Urdu, all from Pakistan.)

Some publications note that pheni with milk is considered a calorie-dense and fat-enriched sweet dish that should only be consumed occasionally. Although it offers quick carbohydrates, helping in slow digestion and sustained energy while fasting during the day, consuming it in large amounts may cause resistance in weight-losing physical activities. While semolina has slightly higher fibre than flour, pheni still lacks significant fibre and is made up of empty calories more than an average paratha. (Note: Facts are largely attributed to Jacked Nutrition, while portions of the text are also taken from two of the reports published in Dawn.)

In January 2026, the Chief Medical and Health Officer (CMHO) ordered the destruction of about a ton of pheni at a shop in Jodhpur, Rajasthan, when concerns about hygiene were raised after a video circulated on social media in which the dough for pheni was being prepared with feet. In a separate incident in February, the police seized a warehouse in Jiyaguda, Hyderabad, India, which contained material for preparing pheni worth est. ₹3.98 lakh, because it reportedly violated guidelines of the Food Safety and Standards Authority of India (FSSAI) by being substandard.

== See also ==
- Indian cuisine
