= Nasir Iqbal Bosal =

Pakistani politician

Raja Nasir Iqbal
- ناصر اقبال بوسال

Member of the National Assembly of Pakistan
- Incumbent
- Assumed office 29 February 2024
- Constituency: NA-69 Mandi Bahauddin-II
- In office 13 August 2018 – 10 August 2023
- Constituency: NA-86 (Mandi Bahauddin-II)
- In office 1 June 2013 – 31 May 2018
- Constituency: NA-109 (Mandi Bahauddin-II)

Personal details
- Born: 30 November 1968 (age 57) Mandi Bahauddin, Punjab, Pakistan
- Party: PMLN (2007-present)
- Relatives: Imdad Ullah Bosal (Brother); Ghulam Hussain Bosal (Cousin); Akhtar Abbas Bosal (Cousin)

Nasir Iqbal Bosal (Note: Urdu: ناصر اقبال بوسال) (born 30 November 1970) is a Pakistani politician who has been a member of the National Assembly of Pakistan since February 2024 and previously served in this position from August 2018 till August 2023 and from June 2013 to May 2018.

== Early life ==
He was born on 30 November 1970. He belongs to a Bosal Jat family.

== Political career ==
He ran for the seat of the National Assembly of Pakistan as a candidate of Pakistan Muslim League (Q) (PML-Q) from Constituency NA-109 (Mandi Bahauddin-II) in the 2002 Pakistani general election, but was unsuccessful.

He ran for the seat of National Assembly as a candidate of PML-Q from Constituency NA-109 (Mandi Bahauddin-II) in the 2008 Pakistani general election, but was unsuccessful.

He was elected to the National Assembly as a candidate of Pakistan Muslim League (N) (PML-N) from Constituency NA-109 (Mandi Bahauddin-II) in the 2013 Pakistani general election.

He was re-elected to the National Assembly as a candidate of PML-N from Constituency NA-86 (Mandi Bahauddin-II) in the 2018 Pakistani general election.
