= Malakwal Tehsil =

Malakwal تحصیل ملکوال
- Tehsil
- Country: Pakistan
- Province: (Punjab, Pakistan) Punjab
- District: Mandi Bahauddin

Population (2017)
  - Tehsil: 371,869
  - Urban: 43,421
  - Rural: 328,448
- Time zone: UTC+5 (PST)
- Number of Union Councils: 17

Malakwal (Urdu: تحصیل ملکوال) is one of the three tehsils of Mandi Bahauddin District, in Punjab, Pakistan. The city of Malakwal is the headquarters of the tehsil, which is administratively subdivided into 17 union councils.
