= Malakwal =

City in Mandi Bahauddin District, Pakistan

Malakwal ملکوال
- City
- Location of Malakwal Malakwal (Pakistan)
- Coordinates: 32°33′11″N 73°12′24″E
- Country: Pakistan
- Province: Punjab
- Division: Gujrat
- District: Mandi Bahauddin
- Tehsil: Malakwal
- No. of Union councils: 17
- Banks: 20+

Government
  - Language: Punjabi and Urdu
- Elevation: 205 m (673 ft)

Population (2023)
  - Total: 51,327
- Time zone: UTC+5 (PST)
  - Summer (DST): UTC+6 (DST)
- Postal Code: 50530
- Area code: 0546

Malakwal (Urdu: ملکوال) is a city in Mandi Bahauddin District, Punjab, Pakistan.

== History ==
In 997 CE, Sultan Mahmud Ghaznavi took over the Ghaznavid dynasty empire established by his father, Sultan Sebuktegin. In 1005, he conquered the Shahis in Kabul, and followed it up with the conquest of the Punjab region. The Delhi Sultanate and later the Mughal Empire ruled the region. The Punjab region became predominantly Muslim due to missionary Sufi saints whose dargahs dot the landscape of Punjab region.

After the formation of the Sikh Empire in 1801, Malakwal was also invaded and occupied by the Sikhs. During the British rule, Malakwal increased in population and importance.

The predominantly Muslim population supported All-India Muslim League and the Pakistan Movement. After the independence of Pakistan in 1947, the minority Hindus and Sikhs migrated to India while the Muslim refugees from India settled down here.

== Demographics ==
Population

Historical population
Year	Pop.	±% p.a.
1972	18,451	—
1981	22,734	+2.35%
1998	31,258	+1.89%
2017	43,423	+1.75%
2023	51,327	+2.83%

According to the 2023 census, Malakwal had a population of 51,327, up from 43,423 in 2017. It is a town in Mandi Bahauddin District, Punjab, Pakistan.
