= Chaudhry Bilal Ijaz =

Pakistani politician (born 1970)

- بلال اعجاز

Chairman of the Punjab Zakat and Ushr Council
- In office April 2019 – April 2022
- Governor: Chaudhry Sarwar; Omer Sarfraz Cheema
- Chief Minister: Usman Buzdar
- Zakat and Ushr Minister: Shoukat Ali Laleka
- Preceded by: Akhtar Hassan

Member of the National Assembly of Pakistan
- In office 29 February 2024 – 13 August 2024
- Constituency: NA-81 Gujranwala-V
- In office 16 November 2002 – 15 November 2007
- Preceded by: New seat
- Succeeded by: Mudassar Qayyum Nahra
- Constituency: NA-100 (Gujranwala-VI)

Personal details
- Born: Chaudhry Bilal Ijaz; 8 October 1970 (age 56) Gujranwala, Punjab, Pakistan
- Party: PTI (2014-present)
- Other political affiliations: PML(Q) (2002-2014); PMLN (1997-2002)
- Parent: Chaudhry Ijaz Ahmad (father)
- Relatives: Chaudhry Shamshad Ahmad Khan (brother-in-law)
- Education: Forman Christian College
- Occupation: Politician

Chaudhry Bilal Ijaz (Urdu/Punjabi: چوہدری بلال اعجاز; born 8 October 1970) is a Pakistani politician who has been a member of the National Assembly of Pakistan since February 2024 and previously served in this position from 2002 to 2007.

Born in Gujranwala, Bilal Ijaz was elected to the National Assembly in the 2002 general election as a Pakistan Muslim League (Q) (PML-Q) candidate from constituency NA-100 (Gujranwala-VI).

He contested the 2008 and 2013 general elections as a PML-Q and independent candidate, respectively, but was unsuccessful. In late 2014, Ijaz joined the Pakistan Tehreek-e-Insaf (PTI). He contested in the 2018 election from NA-84 constituency but was defeated by Azhar Qayyum Nahra of the PML-N. He once again returned to the National Assembly after his victory in the 2024 elections.

From 2019 to 2022, he served as chairman of the Punjab Zakat and Ushr Council.

Anti Terrorism court Sarghodha convicted him in cases related to Musa Khel Mianwali Police Station. He was sentenced to 10 years in prisons on 22 July 2025.

== Early life and education ==
Bilal Ijaz was born on 8 October 1970 in Gujranwala, Punjab. He hails from the tehsil of Nowshera Virkan in Gujranwala District and belongs to the Rajput community. He graduated from the Forman Christian College in Lahore in 1997 and is an agriculturist by profession.

Ijaz's father, Chaudhry Ijaz Ahmad, was also a politician who had been elected as an MNA first from constituency NA-103 (Sheikhupura) in 1985 and then thrice from his home constituency of NA-79 (Gujranwala-cum-Hafizabad) in 1988, 1993 and 1997.

His brother-in-law, Chaudhry Shamshad Ahmad Khan, was a four-time MPA who twice served as a minister in the Punjab cabinet.

== Political career ==
Ijaz entered politics following his father's death. His father was re-elected as an MNA of the Pakistan Muslim League (N) (PML-N) from NA-79 in the preceding 1997 general election, but died while in office. Consequently, his vacant seat was occupied by PML-N candidate Chaudhry Ahmed Raza in the by-election. In the 2002 general election, Ijaz contested for a National Assembly seat from his reconstituted local constituency, NA-100 (Gujranwala-VI; now part of NA-84), as a Pakistan Muslim League (Q) (PML-Q) candidate. He was elected after receiving 73,107 votes and defeating Hamid Nasir Chattha, a PML-J candidate, by a margin of approximately 25,000 votes. The PML-Q formed the federal government under the regime of Pervez Musharraf. During his tenure as MNA, Ijaz's areas of legislative interest included education and defence. He was a member of the National Assembly's standing committees on Culture, Sports, Tourism and Youth Affairs; Housing and Works; Minorities; and Planning and Development. In addition, Ijaz also served as the Parliamentary Secretary for Information and Media Development, reporting to the Ministry of Information and Broadcasting.

In the 2008 general election, Ijaz once again contested as a PML-Q candidate from NA-100. He received 53,285 votes and lost by a narrow margin to Mudassar Qayyum Nahra, an independent candidate who later joined the PML-N. Ijaz left his party after the poll and began to tilt towards the PML-N. In 2010, Mudassar Qayyum Nahra's membership was suspended and his seat in NA-100 fell vacant after Ijaz filed a petition in an election tribunal of the Lahore High Court, seeking Nahra's disqualification over a fake degree case. In the petition, Ijaz invoked Articles 62 and 63 of the Constitution and argued that Nahra was ineligible to hold public office. Ijaz did not contest in the by-election that followed; the seat was won by Chaudry Tussadiq Masud Khan, a PPP candidate who defeated Mudassar's brother and also the PML-N's designated candidate, Azhar Qayyum Nahra.

In the lead-up to the 2013 general election, Ijaz was tipped as a strong candidate in NA-100 alongside his main political opponents, Azhar Qayyum Nahra of the PML-N and Chaudry Tussadiq Masud Khan of the PPP. Nahra and Ijaz were both vying for candidacy on behalf of the PML-N in NA-100 and shared a competitive rivalry. It was reported that much of the vote in this constituency was determined by clan-based allegiances. Nahra enjoyed the support of his Jatt community, while Ijaz was backed by the Rajput community. Furthermore, the two endorsed their political allies for the local Punjab Provincial Assembly constituencies of PP-101 and PP-102; Nahra backed Riaz Amanat Ali Virk and Chaudhry Rafaqat Hussain Gujjar for these seats, while Ijaz backed Khalid Parvez Virk and Irfan Bashir Gujjar respectively. Ijaz's lobby, which called itself the ittihad ("unity") group, claimed to have enlisted the support of various other local clans and likeminded leaders such as Hamid Nasir Chattha. However, the PML-N ultimately awarded its tickets in favour of Nahra's group. Subsequently, Ijaz contested as an independent candidate. He received 70,318 votes and lost to Azhar Qayyum Nahra by around 20,000 votes. In November 2014, Ijaz joined the opposition party Pakistan Tehreek-e-Insaf (PTI) and served as a senior core member of the party.

In the 2018 general election, he was fielded as the PTI's candidate for his newly delimited electorate of NA-84. Although the PTI won the election and was able to form both the federal and Punjab provincial governments, Ijaz was unsuccessful in his constituency. He received 89,943 votes and lost to the PML-N's Azhar Qayyum Nahra by a margin of around 30,000 votes (for the third time consecutively). The result was noted to be consistent with the PML-N's overall electoral dominance in Gujranwala District.

In the 2024 general election, he won a seat in the National Assembly. On 29 February, he was sworn in as a Member of the National Assembly. However, following a vote recount, his opponent was declared the winner. This notification, was cancelled by LHC later on though. In August 2024,Supreme Court of Pakistan nullified orders of Lahore High Court and disqualified him again.

== Political appointments ==
In April 2019, Ijaz was appointed as the chairman of the Punjab Zakat and Ushr Council by the provincial government of the Punjab. His co-chair for the committee is the provincial Minister for Zakat and Ushr, Shoukat Ali Laleka. His name came into contention for the post following a recommendation made by prime minister Imran Khan to the Punjab chief minister, Usman Buzdar. The primary function of the Zakat and Ushr Council is to collect the revenues obtained in Punjab from the Islamic taxes levied in Pakistan, known as zakat and ushr, and disburse these funds for the purposes of human and social development. In his role as chairman, Ijaz has officially coordinated and discharged these duties throughout the province.

== See also ==
- List of members of the 12th National Assembly of Pakistan

Assembly seats
New seat	Member of the National Assembly of Pakistan for NA-100 (Gujranwala-VI); 2002–2007	Succeeded by Mudassar Qayyum Nahra
Political offices
Preceded by Akhtar Hassan	Chairman of the Punjab Zakat and Ushr Council; 2019–present	Incumbent
