= Islamic economics =

Handling of economics based on Islamic jurisprudence

Islamic economics (Arabic: الاقتصاد الإسلامي) refers to the knowledge of economics or economic activities and processes in terms of Islamic principles and teachings. Islam has a set of specific moral norms and values about individual and social economic behavior. Therefore, it has its own economic system, which is based on its philosophical views and is compatible with the Islamic organization of other aspects of human behavior: social and political systems.

Over the years, the term Islamic economics has been applied to various theories, but several recurring principles often emerge. They are based in primary sources such as Qur'an and hadith, but also historical practices in the Medinan First Islamic State and the Rashidun Caliphate. Contemporary Islamic Economics synthesizes these principles into proposals such as 100% backed gold bullion standard, full reserve banking, implementing a land tax, using profit-and-loss-sharing (PLS) financing, promoting a welfare state economy , nationalizing natural resources—including water, energy, and grazing lands, and placing central banks and money issuance under full public control.

Islamic economics is a broad field, related to the more specific subset of Islamic commercial jurisprudence (Arabic: فقه المعاملات, fiqh al-mu'āmalāt). It is also an ideology of economics with some similarities to the labour theory of value, which is "labour-based exchange and exchange-based labour".

Islamic commercial jurisprudence entails the rules of transacting finance or other economic activity in a Shari'a compliant manner, i.e., a manner conforming to Islamic scripture (Quran and sunnah). Islamic jurisprudence (fiqh) has traditionally dealt with determining what is required, prohibited, encouraged, discouraged, or just permissible. according to the revealed word of God (Quran) and the religious practices established by Muhammad (sunnah). This applied to issues like property, money, employment, taxes, loans, along with everything else. The social science of economics, on the other hand, works to describe, analyse and understand production, distribution, and consumption of goods and services, and, studied how to best achieve policy goals, such as full employment, price stability, economic equity and productivity growth.

Early forms of capitalism are thought to have been developed in the Islamic Golden Age, starting from the 9th century, and later became dominant in European Muslim territories like Al-Andalus and the Emirate of Sicily. The Islamic economic concepts taken and applied by the gunpowder empires and various Islamic kingdoms and sultanates led to systemic changes in their economy, particularly in the Mughal Empire. Its wealthiest region of Bengal, a major trading nation of the medieval world, signaled the period of proto-industrialization, making direct contribution to the world's first Industrial Revolution after the British conquests.

In the mid-20th century, campaigns began promoting the idea of specifically Islamic patterns of economic thought and behavior. By the 1970s, "Islamic economics" was introduced as an academic discipline in a number of institutions of higher learning throughout the Muslim world and in the West. The central features of an Islamic economy are often summarized as (1) the "behavioral norms and moral foundations" derived from the Quran and Sunnah; (2) collection of zakat and other Islamic taxes; and (3) prohibition of interest (riba) charged on loans.

Advocates of Islamic economics generally describe it as neither socialist nor capitalist but as a "third way", an ideal mean with none of the drawbacks of the other two systems. Among the assertions made for an Islamic economic system by Islamic activists and revivalists are that the gap between the rich and the poor will be reduced and prosperity enhanced, by such means as the discouraging of the hoarding of wealth, taxing wealth (through zakat) but not trade, exposing lenders to risk through profit sharing and venture capital, discouraging of hoarding of food for speculation, and other activities that Islam regards as sinful such as unlawful confiscation of land. Complementing Islamic economics, Islamic entrepreneurship has gained traction, focusing on Muslim entrepreneurs, ventures, and contextual factors at the intersection of Islamic faith and entrepreneurship.

== Definitions and descriptions ==
According to Hasan Raza, after more than six decades of its formal/ informal existence, a consensus on the definition of Islamic economics has not yet emerged. Some definitions that have been offered include:

- "that branch of knowledge which helps to realize human well-being through an allocation and distribution of scarce resources that is in conformity with Islamic teachings without unduly curbing individual freedom or creating continued macroeconomic and ecological imbalances." (Umar Chapra) (similarly, the "study of human behavior with regard to acquiring and using resources for the satisfaction of necessities, needs, and other desires", but "based on the assumptions" of the Islamic "outlook on life and humanity". (Monzer Kahf))
- "the study of an ... economy which abides by the rules of the Shariah", i.e. an Islamic economy (a definition used by some, according to M. Anas Zarqa).
- a discipline that goes beyond the practice of Western economics—which seeks to make "positive analysis" and give an objective description of what is—to provide normative policy prescriptions of what ought to be and can be. And which seeks to achieve a "transformation of human beings from followers of base desires to people concerned with achieving higher goals". (Feisal Khan describing the ideas of M.R. Zaman, M.U. Chapra, and M.N. Khan & M.I. Bhatti.)
- "a discipline that is guided by the Shariah and studies all human societies" (A definition used by others, according to M. Anas Zarqa)
- "restatements of Islamic economic teachings", using "modern economic jargon". (What most of the knowledge content in the body of Islamic economics amounts to according to economist Muhammad Akram Khan)
- an ideology
  - "a revolutionary ideology" to change "the corrupt reality ... into a pure one", and "not a science of political economy" or "an objective analysis of existing reality". (Ayatollah Murtaza Mutahhari)
  - an "ideological construct" developed by 20th century Islamists (by Abul A'la Maududi, Ayatollah Muhammad Baqir al-Sadr, Abolhassan Banisadr, etc.) taking basic prescriptions from sharia (Islamic law), and systematizing and conceptualizing them "to construct a coherent and functional ensemble offering a middle ground between the two systems of the twentieth century, Marxism and capitalism." (Social scientist Olivier Roy)
- Zaman (2015) argues that confusion regarding appropriate definition of Islamic economics has arisen because of attempts to mix Western economics concepts with Islamic ideals, when the two are diametrically opposed to each other in many dimensions. He proposes a definition based on purely Islamic sources: "Islamic Economics is the EFFORT/STRUGGLE to implement the orders of Allah pertaining to economic affairs in our individual lives (Micro), in our communities (Meso), and at the level of Ummah (Macro)."

=== Fiqh and Islamic economics ===
Fiqh (religious law) has developed several traditional concepts having to do with economics. These included:

- Zakat – the "charitable taxing of certain assets, such as currency, gold, or harvest, with an eye to allocating these taxes to eight expenditures that are also explicitly defined in the Quran, such as aid to those in need."
- Gharar—"uncertainty". The presence of any element of excessive uncertainty, in a contract is prohibited.
- Riba—"referred to as usury (modern Islamic economists reached consensus that Riba is any kind of interest, rather than just usury)"

Another source lists "general rules" include prohibition of Riba, Gharar, and also

- Qimar / Maisir : (gambling) and
- the encouragement of Taa'won (mutual cooperation),
- "the overriding doctrine of fairness in commercial dealings is established".

These concepts, like others in Islamic law, came from study of the Quran and ahadith.

In addition to Quran and ahadith, sometimes other sources such as al-urf (custom), or al-ijma (consensus of the jurists) are employed, to create laws that determine whether actions were forbidden, discouraged, allowed, encouraged and obligatory for Muslims. The different school of fiqh (madhhab) vary slightly in their rulings.

Works of fiqh are typically divided into different "books" such as a Book of Iman, of Salah, Zakat, Taqwa, Hajj, but not 'economics' or 'economy'. Some brief works might contain almost nothing related to matters of property, sales, finance (Note: such as The Essential Hanafi Handbook of Fiqh by Qazi Thanaa Ullah).) Others do not gather questions on economic issues in one heading, the case in Tawzih al-masa'il, a work of fatawa by Ayatollah Ruhollah Khomeini, who although a pioneer of political Islam approached the subject of economy

as the classical ulamas do ... the chapter on selling and buying (Kharid o forush) comes after the one on pilgrimage and present economic questions as individual acts open to moral analysis: 'To lend [without interest, on a note from the lender] is among the good works that are particularly recommended in the verses of the Quran and in the Traditions.'

— Ruhollah Khomeini, Tawzih al-masa'il, p. 543

Other works divided the subjects of fiqh into four "quarters": typically worship (al-'Ibadat), marriage and family law (al-Munakahat), criminal law (Jinayat), commercial transaction law (Mu'amalat). At least one author (M. Kahf) writes that Mu'amalat is "closely related" to Islamic Economics. (However even with the "quarters" division of fiqh topics mu'amalat would not include inheritance or wedding dower (mahr) (which at least often comes under marriage and family law), or calculation of alms (zakat, which comes under al-'Ibadat)).

A number of scholars (Olivier Roy, Timur Kuran, Omar Norman) have noted the recentness of reflecting on economic issues in the Islamic world, and the difference between economics the social science based on data, and Islamic jurisprudence based on revealed truth.

Salman Ahmed Shaikh and Monzer Kahf insist on a clear distinction between the roles of Fiqh and Islamic Economics, Shaikh saying

to be meritorious as a separate field of inquiry, Islamic economics cannot confine itself just to explaining and deducing laws in economic matters based on core principles. Since this function is already performed by the discipline of Islamic jurisprudence ...

M. Kahf writes that mu'amalat and Islamic economics "often intermingle", mu'amalat "sets terms and conditions of conduct for economic and financial relationships in the Islamic economy" and provides the "grounds on which new instruments" of Islamic financing are developed, but that the "nature of Fiqh imposes a concern about individual transactions and their minute legalistic characteristics", so that analyzing Islamic economics in terms of Fiqh" risks losing "the ability to provide a macro economic theory".

According to economist Muhammad Akram Khan the "main plank" of Islamic economics is the "theory of riba", while "another landmark" is zakat, a tax on wealth and income. According to another contemporary writer Salah El-Sheikh, "Islamic economic principles" (what he calls a "FiqhiConomic model") utilize the Faqīh (Islamic jurisprudence) as supporting material, but are grounded upon the ethical teachings within the Qu'rān. Sharīah's basic tenets involve gharar and (fadl māl bilā 'iwad). Gharar insists all knowledge about a trade or transaction is known before two individuals complete a transaction and (fadl māl bilā 'iwad) warns against unjustified enrichment through trade and business. These tenets were "among the first economic regulations" and their philosophy can be seen today in modern Capitalism. Within Sharīah, El-Sheikh states, Gharar functions as a divine deterrent against asymmetric information and allows trade to prosper. Riba, ensures each transaction is conducted at a fair price, not allowing one party to benefit exceedingly, which shares a parallel philosophy with Karl Marx "Das Kapital": seeking a greater outcome for the community.

== History ==
=== Pre-modern Muslim thought on economics ===
Classical scholars in the Muslim world did however, make valuable contributions to Islamic thought on issues involving production, consumption, income, wealth, property, taxation, land ownership, etc. are Abu Yusuf (d. 798), Muhammad bin al-Hasan (d. 805), Al-Mawardi (d. 1058), Ibn Hazm (d. 1064), Sarakhsi (d. 1090), Tusi (d. 1093), Ghazali (d. 1111), Al-Dimashqi (d. after 1175), Ibn Rushd (d. 1187), Ibn Taymiyyah (d.1328), Ibn al-Ukhuwwah (d. 1329), Ibn al-Qayyim (d. 1350), Sayyid Ali Hamadani (d. 1384), Al-Shatibi (d. 1388), Ibn Khaldun (d. 1406), Al-Maqrizi (d. 1442), Dawwani (d. 1501), Muhammad Aurangzeb Alamgir (d. 1707).

Abu Yusuf (d. 798) was author of the book al Kharaj—literally "the return or revenue" but was used by the author to mean "public revenues and taxation"—which was a policy guide to Harun al-Rashid, the fifth Abbasid Caliph. Muhammad bin al-Hasan (d.805) wrote al Iktisab fi al Rizq al Mustatab [Earned Desired income], intended as advice to businessmen "in their endeavors to create income opportunities". Abu 'Ubaid al Qasim bin Sallam (d.839) was the author of al-Amwal (plural of "wealth").

Perhaps the most well-known Islamic scholar who wrote about economical issues was Ibn Khaldun, (Note: also called the father of modern Historiography and Sociology. Schumpeter (1954) p 136 mentions his sociology, others, including Hosseini (2003) emphasize him as well) who has been called "the father of modern economics" by I.M. Oweiss. Ibn Khaldun wrote on what is now called economic and political theory in the introduction, or Muqaddimah (Prolegomena), of his History of the World (Kitab al-Ibar). He discussed what he called asabiyya (social cohesion), which he cited as the cause of the advancement of some civilizations. Ibn Khaldun felt that many social forces are cyclic, although there could be sudden sharp turns that break the pattern.

His ideas about the benefits of the division of labor also relate to asabiyya, the greater the social cohesion, the more complex the successful division may be, the greater the economic growth. He noted that growth and development positively stimulates both supply and demand, and that the forces of supply and demand are what determines the prices of goods. He also noted macroeconomic forces of population growth, human capital development, and technological developments effects on development. In fact, Ibn Khaldun thought that population growth was directly a function of wealth.

Medieval Islamic economics appears to have somewhat resembled a form of capitalism, some arguing that it laid the foundations for the development of modern capitalism.

=== Early modern period ===
Economic policies based on sharia were introduced throughout the gunpowder empires, which led to their commercial expansion. Chiefly the Ottoman Empire and Mughal India underwent substantial increases in per capita income and population, and a sustained pace of technological innovation. A significant event was the creation of Muslim India's Fatawa 'Alamgiri, compiled by Mughal Emperor Aurangzeb Alamgir and Shah Waliullah Dehlawi's family, through which the Indian subcontinent surpassed Qing China to become the world's largest economy, valued 25% of world GDP, while the region of Mughal Bengal entered a period of proto-industrialization, making direct contribution to England's first Industrial Revolution after English dominance was established following the Battle of Plassey.

=== Development of "Islamic economics" ===
According to Turkish-American economist Timur Kuran, "not until the mid-twentieth century" was there any body of thought that could be called "Islamic economics", that was "recognizable as a coherent or self-contained doctrine". But around 1950 "campaigns launched to identify self-consciously, if not also exclusively, Islamic patterns of economic thought and behavior". The famous early-20th Century Muslim nationalist and author Muhammad Iqbal, for example, did not refer to religion in his treatise on economics.

Islamic economics grew naturally from the Islamic revival and political Islam whose adherents considered Islam to be a complete system of life in all its aspects, rather than a spiritual formula and believed that it logically followed that Islam must have an economic system, unique from and superior to non-Islamic economic systems. (Note: M.T. Usmani, for example states: "Unlike other religions, Islam is not confined to some moral teachings, some rituals or some modes of worship. It rather contains guidance in every sphere of life including socio-economic fields. The obedience from servants of Allah is required not only in worship, but also in their economic activities, ...") "Islamic economics" "emerged" in the 1940s according to the Encyclopedia of Islam and the Muslim World. Maulana ala Maududi's 1941 address "The economic problem of man and its Islamic solution" (Insaan ka Maashi Maslah aur aus ka Islami Hul) is "generally considered to be one of the founding documents of modern Islamic economics"

More conservative salafi have shown less interest in socioeconomic issues, asking the question, "the prophet and his companions didn't study 'laws' of economics, look for patterns, strive for understanding of what happens in commerce, production, consumption. Why should we?" Maududi himself also dismissed the need for a "new science of economics, embodied in voluminous books, with high-sounding terminology and large organisation", as the true "economic problem of man"—along with all his social, political and other problems—"can be easily understood" and is simply the failure to follow Islamic law.

1960, 70s

In the 1960s and 1970s, Shi'a thinkers worked to describe Islamic economics' "own answers to contemporary economic problems". Several works were particularly influential:

- Eslam va Malekiyyat (Islam and Property) by Mahmud Taleqani (1951),
- Iqtisaduna (Our Economics) by Mohammad Baqir al-Sadr (1961) and
- Eqtesad-e Towhidi (The Economics of Divine Harmony) by Abolhassan Banisadr (1978)
- Some Interpretations of Property Rights, Capital and Labor from Islamic Perspective by Habibullah Peyman (1979).

Al-Sadr in particular was described as having "almost single-handedly developed the notion of Islamic economics".

In their writings, Sadr and the other authors "sought to depict Islam as a religion committed to social justice, the equitable distribution of wealth, and the cause of the deprived classes," with doctrines "acceptable to Islamic jurists," while refuting existing non-Islamic theories of capitalism and Marxism. Mohammad Baqir al-Sadr and also cleric Mahmoud Taleghani developed an "Islamic economics" emphasizing a major role for the state in matters such as circulation and equitable distribution of wealth, and a reward to participants in the marketplace for being exposed to risk or liability. This version of Islamic economics, which influenced the Iranian Revolution, called for public ownership of land and of large "industrial enterprises", while private economic activity continued "within reasonable limits". These ideas informed the large public sector and public subsidy policies of the Iranian Revolution.

Sunni cleric Taqiuddin al-Nabhani proposed economic system (Nidham ul-Iqtisad fil Islam (The Economic System of Islam) by Taqiuddin Nabhani (1953)) combined public ownership of large chunks of the economy (utilities, public transport, health care, energy resources such as oil, and unused farm land), with use of the gold standard and specific instructions for the gold and silver weights of coins, arguing this would "demolish ... American control and the control of the dollar as an international currency."

Likewise, Sunni imam Imran Nazar Hosein preached a similar system to al-Nabhani, advocating for a syncretic system with a gold / silver standard, while also having heavy government regulations of the market. Hosein is notable for being among a faction of Islamic scholars with a strict interpretation of riba prohibitions in the Qur'an, with the general definition of interest being as broad as money increasing over time for a single purchase.

In the Sunni world the first international conference on Islamic economics was held at the King Abdulaziz University in Jeddah in 1976. Since then the International Association for Islamic Economics in collaboration with the Islamic Development Bank has held conferences in Islamabad (1983), Kuala Lumpur (1992), Loughborough (2000), Bahrain (2003), Jakarta (2005) and Jeddah (2008), Iqbal (2008). In addition there have been hundreds of seminars, workshops and discussion groups around the world on Islamic economics and finance. In the U.S. a small number of patent applications have been filed for Sharia compliant financial service methods.

Khomeini era

What has been called one of "two versions" of "Islamic economy" existed during the first ten years (1979–1989) of the Islamic Republic of Iran during the life of Supreme Leader (and revolution founder) Ayatollah Ruhollah Khomeini. This was an "Islamist socialist, and state-run": It was "little by little supplanted" by a more liberal economic policy.

Post-socialist trend

In the 1980s and 1990s, as the Islamic revolution failed to reach the per capita income level achieved by the regime it overthrew, and communist states and socialist parties in the non-Muslim world turned away from socialism, Muslim interest shifted away from government ownership and regulation. In Iran, "eqtesad-e Eslami (meaning both Islamic economics and economy) ... once a revolutionary shibboleth, is indubitably absent in all official documents and the media. It disappeared from Iranian political discourse" about 1990. During the era of Zia-ul-Haq, several Islamic economic concepts and practices were introduced into the domestic economy, as part of Zia's Islamisation reforms (see Islamic economics in Pakistan).

The term lived on in the Muslim world, shifting form to the less ambitious goal of interest-free banking. Some Muslim bankers and religious leaders suggested ways to integrate Islamic law on usage of money with modern concepts of ethical investing. In banking this was done through the use of sales transactions (focusing on the fixed rate return modes) to support investing without interest-bearing debt. Many modern writers have strongly criticized this approach as a means of covering conventional banking with an Islamic facade. (Sohrab Behada has argued that the economic system proposed by Islam is essentially a capitalist one.)

==== Similarity of Islamic economy with other countries ====
In an interview with Professor Hossein Askari, a professor at George Washington University, the German newspaper "Suddeutsche" prepared a report on the ranking of countries that "respect Islamic values". Ireland, Luxembourg and Denmark are at the top of the said ranking table in relation to "Islamic economy in non-Islamic countries". No Muslim-majority country is among the top 25 countries in this ranking. Israel is in 27th place and thus much higher than Saudi Arabia which is in 91st place. Germany is in 26th place in this table. In the research conducted by Shahrzad Rahman and Hossein Askari, two professors of George Washington University, an estimate of the extent of Islamic economy of 208 countries around the world was made, the results of which are very interesting and according to that, many countries that, although are not Islamic (such as Ireland, Denmark, Luxembourg and Sweden); But their economy has similarities with the economic model of Islam or the Islamic economy.

== Macroeconomics ==
Islamic Economics does not have major mathematical works at its current stage, although some of its principles include mathematical formulae. These include the gold standard, land tax, profit & loss sharing financing, as well as full reserve banking. So far, there are at least two books on Islamic Macroeconomics, and a few academic papers.

=== PLS Financing ===
==== Model of the PLS System ====
The total amount of payment : S_{t} (p) = I_{t} + B_{t} (p) + C_{t} , t = 1,2,..., T .

Profit sharing with portion p>0: B_{t} (p) = {p(w_{t} - I_{t} - C_{t}) (w_{t} - I_{t} - C_{t})>0, {0, (w_{t} - I_{t} - C_{t}) ≤0.

=== Full Reserve Banking ===
==== Wage Inflation ====
(F.12) . ω^{T} = (W/p)^^{T} = Ω_{0} + Ω_{1} * pr + Ω_{2} * N/Nf_{e}

(F.13) . W = W-_{1} * { 1 + Ω_{3} * (W^{T}-_{1} - W-_{1})}

=== Land Tax ===
==== Asset Pricing Equation ====
V_{ik} = ω_{ik} (R_{ik}) + 1/Φ_{ik} log [ exp Φ_{ik} ( 1/1+p * V_{ik} - q_{ikk}) + exp Φ_{ik} ( 1/1+p (V_{i0}/m_{ik} - pD_{k},_{i}) - q_{ik0})] - τ_{ik}/1+p * V_{ik}

=== Gold Standard ===
==== Buyer Preferences ====
U (q, x) = u (q) + x

==== Seller Preferences ====
Vᶦ (q, x) = −ωᶦq + x

==== Buyer's Bellman Equation ====
J (s,t) = σ[u(qw (s,t)) + W (s - zw (s,t) , t )] + (1 - σ) W (s,t).

== As an academic discipline ==
=== Achievements ===
In 1998, Javed Ahmad Khan compiled Islamic Economics and Finance: A Bibliography, and listed 1600 items published over 20 years, including books, articles, dissertations, theses and conference papers.

As of 2008 there were:

- Eight magazines recently started "exclusively devoted to Islamic economics and finance",
- 484 research projects in various universities of ten countries including the US, the UK and Germany.
- 200 Ph.D. dissertations completed at different universities of the world, literature published English, Arabic, Urdu, Bahasa Malaysia, Turkish and other regional languages.
- "Over a thousand unique titles on Islamic economics and finance" in IFP databank
- 1500 conferences (whose proceedings are available in IFP databank)
- One school—the Kulliyyah of Economics and Management Sciences of International Islamic University Malaysia (IIUM)—has produced over 2000 graduates in 25 years as of 2009.

King Abdulaziz University, Jeddah hosted the first international conference on Islamic economics in 1976. Thereafter the International Association for Islamic Economics in collaboration with the Islamic Development Bank has held conferences in Islamabad (1983), Kuala Lumpur (1992), Loughborough (2000), Bahrain (2003), Jakarta (2005), Jeddah (2008) and Iqbal (2008).

In a 2023 academic review, it was noted that there were over 11,700 academic publications by scholars in Islamic economics (books, articles, conference papers).

=== Economists ===
A small handful of economists have either supported, contributed to, or researched Islamic Economics. These include Umar Chapra, Abdul Azim Islahi, Mohammad Nejatullah Siddiqi, Abbas Mirakhor, Rodney Wilson, Tariqullah Khan, Seyed Hossein Mir-Moezi, Masudul Alam Choudhury, and Humayon Dar.

=== Journals ===
Some key journals include the following:

- Islamic Economic Studies
- Journal of Islamic Economics
- International Journal of Islamic Economics and Finance Studies
- Journal of King Abdul aziz University : Islamic Economics:

=== Challenges ===
Along with these achievements, some Islamic economists have complained of problems in the academic discipline: a shift in interest away from Islamic Economics to Islamic Finance since the 1980s, a shortage of university courses, reading materials that are "either scant or of poor quality", lack of intellectual freedom, "narrow focus" on interest-free banking and zakat without data-based research to substantiate claim made for them—that interest causes economic problems or that zakat solves them.

A number of economists have lamented that while Islamic finance was originally a "subset" of Islamic economics, economics and research in pure Islamic economics has been "shifted to the back burner". Funding for research has gone to Islamic finance despite the lack of "scientific knowledge to back" the claims made for Islamic finance. Enrollment has subsided in classes and second and third generation Islamic economists are scarce, some institutions have "lost their real direction and some have even been closed". and interest of economists in the field's "grand idea" of providing an alternative to capitalism and socialism has "yielded" to the "needs" of the "industry" of Islamic finance.

According to economist Rasem Kayed, while a number of universities and institutes of higher learning now offer courses on Islamic economics and finance "most of the courses offered by these institutions pertain to Islamic finance rather than Islamic economics." Surveying Islamic economics and finance courses being offered as of 2008 by 14 universities in Muslim countries, Kayed found 551 courses in conventional economics and finance, and only 12 courses in Islamic economics and finance (only 2% of the total). This "appalling and intolerable ... negligence" was made worse by the curriculum of the courses which failed to debate "the issues" the discipline or give "due thought to ... the future development of Islamic financial industry" but rather attempted "to squeeze as much abstract information" as possible in their courses, according to Kayed.

Another economist (Muhammad Akram Khan) lamented that "the real problem is that despite efforts for developing a separate discipline of Islamic economics, there is not much that can be genuinely called 'economics'. Most of Islamic economics consists of theology on economic matters." Another (M.N. Siddiqi) notes Islamic economics has been teaching "conventional economics from an Islamic perspective", rather than Islamic economics.

Despite its start in 1976, as of 2009, 2013 Islamic economics was called still in its infancy, its "curricula frames, course structures, reading materials, and research", "mostly" anchored in the "mainstream tradition", "lacking sufficiency, depth, coordination and direction", with teaching faculties in many cases ... found short of the needed knowledge, scholarship, and commitment." "Distinct textbooks and teaching materials" required have been found to "neither exist" nor be "easy to create". Despite shortcomings in academic writing—most of the books are "not cohesive" and are "at best no more than extended papers on specific topics"—constructive evaluations are not common and response to what there is even less common. The lack of an Islamic economics textbook "looms large" for Muslim economists and scholars. Despite the holding of a workshop in November 2010 to arrange the writing of such a textbook, the participation of "a number of eminent Muslim economists", (at the International Institute of Islamic Thought in London) and the appointment of "a noted Muslim economist" to coordinate the production of the textbook, as of 2015 "no standard textbook of Islamic economics was available."

Islamic economic institutes are not known for their intellectual freedom, and according to Muhammad Akram Khan are unlikely to allow criticism of the ideas or policies of their founding leaders or governments. The Centre for Research in Islamic Economics, an organ of the Jeddah University in Saudi Arabia, for example, "cannot allow publication of any work that goes against the orthodox thinking of the influential" Saudi religious leadership. Despite "tall talk about ijtehad", Islamic economists "are shy" about "suggesting innovative ideas" for fear of antagonizing religious clerics.

Use of Islamic terminology not only for distinctive Islamic concepts such as riba, zakat, mudaraba but also for concepts that do not have specific Islamic connotation—adl for justice, hukuma for government—locking out non-Muslim and even not Arabic speaking readers from the content of Islamic economics and even "giving legitimacy" to "pendantry" in the field.

== Property ==
According to authors F. Nomani and A. Rahnema, the Qur'an states that God is the sole owner of all matter in the heavens and the earth, but man is God's viceregent on earth and holds God's possessions in trust (amanat). Islamic jurists divide properties into public, state, private categories.

Some Muslims believe that the Shariah provides "specific laws and standards regarding the use and allocation of resources including land, water, animals, minerals, and manpower."

=== Public property ===
According to M. A. Khan, "Islam introduced the distinction between private property and public property and made the rulers accountable to the people". Scholars F. Nomani and A. Rahnema state that public property in Islam refers to natural resources (forests, pastures, uncultivated land, water, mines, oceanic resources etc.) to which all humans have equal right. Such resources are considered the common property of the community. Such property is placed under the guardianship and control of the Islamic state, and can be used by any citizen, as long as that use does not undermine the rights of other citizens, according to Nomani and Rahnema.

The owner of previously public property that is privatized pays zakat and, according to Shi'ite scholars, khums as well. In general, the privatization and nationalization of public property is subject to debate amongst Islamic scholars.

According to an analysis by Walid El-Malik in 1993, only the Maliki school took the position that all kinds of natural resources are state-owned; the Hanafi school took the opposite view and held that mineral ownership followed surface ownership, while the other two schools, Shafi'i and Hanbali, drew a distinction between "hidden" and "unhidden" minerals.

=== State property ===
State property includes certain natural resources, as well as other property that cannot immediately be privatized. Islamic state property can be movable, or immovable, and can be acquired through conquest or peaceful means. Unclaimed, unoccupied and heir-less properties, including uncultivated land (mawat), can be considered state property.

During the life of Muhammad, one fifth of military equipment captured from the enemy in the battlefield was considered state property. During his reign, Umar (on the recommendation of Ali) considered conquered land to be state rather than private property (as was usual practice). The purported reason for this was that privatizing this property would concentrate resources in the hands of a few, and prevent it from being used for the general good. The property remained under the occupation of the cultivators, but taxes were collected on it for the state treasury.

Muhammad said "Old and fallow lands are for God and His Messenger (i.e. state property), then they are for you". Jurists draw from this the conclusion that, ultimately, private ownership takes over state property.

=== Private property ===
There is consensus amongst Islamic jurists and social scientists that Islam recognizes and upholds the individual's right to private ownership. The Qur'an extensively discusses taxation, inheritance, prohibition against stealing, legality of ownership, recommendation to give charity and other topics related to private property. Islam also guarantees the protection of private property by imposing stringent punishments on thieves. Muhammad said that he who dies defending his property was like a martyr.

Islamic economists classify the acquisition of private property into involuntary, contractual and non-contractual categories. Involuntary means are inheritances, bequests, and gifts. Non-contractual acquisition involves the collection and exploitation of natural resources that have not previously been claimed as private property. Contractual acquisition includes activities such as trading, buying, renting, hiring labor etc.

A tradition attributed to Muhammad, with which both Sunni and Shi'a jurists agree, in cases where the right to private ownership causes harm to others, then Islam favors curtailing the right in those cases. Maliki and Hanbali jurists argue that if private ownership endangers public interest, then the state can limit the amount an individual is allowed to own. This view, however, is debated by others.

When Muhammad migrated to Madinah many of the Muslims owned agricultural land. Muhammad confirmed this ownership and allocated land to individuals. The land allotted would be used for housing, farming or gardening. For example, Bilal b. Harith was given land with mineral deposits at 'Aqiq Valley, Hassan b. Thabit was afforded the garden of Bayruha and Zubayr received oasis land at Khaybar and Banu Nadir. During the reign of Caliph Umar, a vast expanse of Persian royal family terrain had been acquired, this lead his successor Caliph Uthman to accelerate the allotment of land to individuals in return for a portion of the crop yield.

== Markets ==
According to M. S. Naz, regulation of markets is among the main functions of hisbah, the "semi-judicial institution" operational from the "earliest days of Islam". It was "charged with responsibility of carrying out the spirit of the system, setting conditions that preserve and enhance the public health and interests, protect the consumers, solve business and labor disputes, promote good market behavior, and ensure their observance". M. A. Khan states, institution of Hisbah as established to "supervise markets, to provide municipal services, and to settle petty disputes". In the contemporary era, Pakistan has attempted to re-create this institution, although it has jurisdiction only over the administrative excesses of the federal government departments and agencies, not provincial ones or private companies.

According to Nomani and Rahnema, Islam accepts markets as the basic coordinating mechanism of the economic system. Islamic teaching holds that the market, given perfect competition, allows consumers to obtain desired goods and producers to sell their goods at a mutually acceptable price.

Three necessary conditions for an operational market are said (by Nomani and Rahnema) to be upheld in Islamic primary sources:

- Freedom of exchange: the Qur'an calls on believers to engage in trade, and rejects the contention that trade is forbidden.
- Private ownership (see above).
- Security of contract: the Qur'an calls for the fulfillment and observation of contracts. The longest verse of the Qur'an deals with commercial contracts involving immediate and future payments.

Another author (Nima Mersadi Tabari) claims that the general doctrine of fairness in sharia law creates "an ethical economic model" and forbids market manipulation such as "inflating the price of commodities by creating artificial shortages (Ihtekar), overbidding for the sole purpose of driving the prices up (Najash) and concealment of vital information in a transaction from the other party (Ghish)".

Further, "uninformed speculation" not based on a proper analysis of available information is forbidden because it is a form of Qimar, or gambling, and results in accumulating Maysir (unearned income). Commercial contracting under conditions of "excessive uncertainty" (however that is defined) is a form of Gharar and so also forbidden.

=== Interference ===
Proponents such as M. A. Khan, Nomani and Rahnema also contend that the "Islamic economy" forbids or at least discourages market manipulation such as price fixing, hoarding and bribery. Government intervention in the economy is tolerated under specific circumstances.

Another author (Nima Mersadi Tabari) states that in Islam "everything is Halal (allowed) unless it has been declared Haram (forbidden)", consequently "the Islamic economic model is based on the freedom of trade and freedom of contract so far as the limits of Shari'ah allow".

Nomani and Rahnema say that Islam prohibits price fixing by a dominating handful of buyers or sellers. During the days of Muhammad, a small group of merchants met agricultural producers outside the city and bought the entire crop, thereby gaining a monopoly over the market. The produce was later sold at a higher price within the city. Muhammad condemned this practice since it caused injury both to the producers (who in the absence of numerous customers were forced to sell goods at a lower price) and the inhabitants.

The above-mentioned reports are also used to justify the argument that the Islamic market is characterized by free information. Producers and consumers should not be denied information on demand and supply conditions. Producers are expected to inform consumers of the quality and quantity of goods they claim to sell. Some scholars hold that if an inexperienced buyer is swayed by the seller, the consumer may nullify the transaction upon realizing the seller's unfair treatment. The Qur'an also forbids discriminatory transactions.

Bribery is also forbidden in Islam and can therefore not be used to secure a deal or gain favor in a transaction, it was narrated that Muhammad cursed the one who offers the bribe, the one who receives it, and the one who arranges it.

Nomani and Rahnema say government interference in the market is justified in exceptional circumstances, such as the protection of public interest. Under normal circumstances, governmental non-interference should be upheld. When Muhammad was asked to set the price of goods in a market he responded, "I will not set such a precedent, let the people carry on with their activities and benefit mutually."

== Banking and finance ==
Islamic banking has been called "the most visible practical achievement" of Islamic economics, and the "most visible mark" of Islamic revivalism. By 2009, there were over 300 "shariah compliant banks and 250 mutual funds around the world, and around $2 trillion were sharia-compliant by 2014.

However, the domination of the industry by debt-like instruments such as murabaha rather than risk-sharing products, has driven even some leading advocates and experts in Islamic banking (such as Muhammad Nejatullah Siddiqi) to talk about "a crisis of identity of the Islamic financial movement."

=== Interest ===
The most noticeable and/or important objective of Islamic Banking has been a ban on the charging of interest on loans. The Quran (3: 130) condemns riba (which is usually translated as "interest"): "O, you who believe! Devour not riba, doubled and redoubled, and be careful of Allah; but fear Allah that you may be successful."

=== Islamic public finance (Bayt-al-Mal) ===
The only financial institution under Islamic Governance (Prophethood and Caliph Period) was Baitulmaal (public treasury) wherein the wealths were distributed instantly on the basis of need. During Prophethood the last receipt was tribute from Bahrain amounting eight hundred thousands dirham which was distributed in just one sitting. Though the first Caliph earmarked a house for Baitulmaal where all money was kept on receipt. As all money was distributed immediately the treasury generally remained locked up. At the time of his death there was only one dirham in the Baitulmaal. The second caliph besides developing the Central Baitulmaal also opened Baitulmaal at state and headquarters levels. He also carried census during his caliphate; and provisioned salaries to Government employees, stipend to poor and needy people along with social security to unemployed and retirement pensions.

The concept of a public financial institution played a historic role in the Islamic economy. The idea of state collected wealth being made available to the needy general public was relatively new. The resources in the Bayt-al-Mal were considered God's resources and a trust, money paid into the shared bank was common property of all the Muslims and the ruler was just the trustee.

The shared bank was treated as a financial institution and therefore subjected to the same prohibitions regarding interest. Caliph Umar spoke on the shared bank saying: "I did not find the betterment of this wealth except in three ways: (i) it is received by right, (ii) it is given by right, and (iii) it is stopped from wrong. As regards my own position vis-a-vis this wealth of yours; it is like that of a guardian of an orphan. If I am well-off, I shall leave it, but if I am hard-pressed I shall take from it as is genuinely permissible."

=== Proposals ===
==== Savings and investment ====
An alternative Islamic savings-investment model can be built around venture capital; investment banks; restructured corporations; and restructured stock market. This model looks at removing the interest-based banking and in replacing market inefficiencies such as subsidization of loans over profit-sharing investments due to double taxation and restrictions on investment in private equity.

==== Hybrids ====
Islamic banks have grown recently in the Muslim world, but are a very small share of the global economy compared to the Western debt banking paradigm. Hybrid approaches, which applies classical Islamic values but uses conventional lending practices, are much lauded by some proponents of modern human development theory.

== Criticism and dispute ==
Islamic economics has been criticised for

- being "constructed on the basis of isolated prescriptions, anecdotes, examples, words of the Prophet, all gathered together and systematized by commentators according to an inductive, casuistic method."
- its alleged "incoherence, incompleteness, impracticality, and irrelevance", driven by "cultural identity" rather than problem solving (Timur Kuran, John Foster);
- being "a hodgepodge of populist and socialist ideas" in theory, and "nothing more than inefficient state control of the economy and some almost equally ineffective redistribution policies" in practice (Fred Halliday);

In a political and regional context where Islamist and ulema claim to have an opinion about everything, it is striking how little they have to say about this most central of human activities, beyond repetitious pieties about how their model is neither capitalist nor socialist.

- being little more than a mimicry of conventional economics embellished with verses of the Quran and sunnah (Muhammad Akram Khan);
- claiming to call for a return to Islamic practices that are actually an "invented tradition" (Timur Kuran); (Note: Islamic economics itself exemplifies what has been called an 'invented tradition.' ... not until the mid-twentieth century were campaigns launched to identify self-consciously, if not also exclusively, Islamic patterns of economic thought and behavior. Until that time the economic content of discourses grounded in Islam's traditional sources lacked systematization; they hardly formed a body of thought recognizable as a coherent or self-contained doctrine.)
- failing to achieve its goals of abolishing interest on money, establishing economic equality, and a superior business ethic; but nonetheless "spared critical scrutiny out of ignorance, misguided tolerance", and because its methods and objectives are considered "too unrealistic to threaten prevailing economic structures" (Timur Kuran).

On economic reforms, Timur Kuran said it is a "vehicle for asserting the primacy of Islam" with reforms being a secondary motive.

Islamic banking and finance

One significant result of Islamic economics (and target of criticism) is the creation of Islamic banking and finance industry. According to several scholars it has bred a new "Power Alliance" of "wealth and Shari'ah scholarship",—wealthy banks and clients paying Islamic scholars to provide bank products with Islamic "shariah compliance". Journalist John Foster, quotes an investment banker based in the Islamic Banking hub of Dubai on the practice of "fatwa shopping",

We create the same type of products that we do for the conventional markets. We then phone up a Sharia scholar for a Fatwa [seal of approval, confirming the product is Shari'ah compliant]. If he doesn't give it to us, we phone up another scholar, offer him a sum of money for his services and ask him for a Fatwa. We do this until we get Sharia compliance. Then we are free to distribute the product as Islamic.

Foster explains that the fee for services provided by "top" scholars is "often" in six-figures, i.e. over US$100,000.

One critic (Muhammad O. Farooq) argues that this unfortunate situation has arisen because the "preoccupation" among supporters of Islamic Economics that any and all interest on loans is riba and forbidden by Islam, and because risk-sharing alternatives to interest bearing loans originally envisioned for Islamic banking have not proven feasible. With the elimination of interest being both the basis of the industry and impractical, shari'a scholars have become "entrapped in a situation" where they are forced to approve transactions fundamentally similar to conventional loans but using "hiyal" manipulation to "maintain an Islamic veneer".

Justice

Instead of "fixating" on interest, Farooq urges a focus on "the larger picture" of "justice", and in economics on fighting exploitation from "greed and profit", and the concentration of wealth. He quotes an ayat in support: "What God has bestowed on his Messenger (and taken away) from the people of the townships, - belongs to God, - to his Messenger and to kindred and orphans, the needy and the wayfarer; in order that it may not (merely) make a circuit between the wealthy among you. ..." Quran 59:7 As an example of the neglect of this issue, Farooq complains that one "rather comprehensive" bibliography of Islamic economics and finance, contains "not a single citation for exploitation or injustice" among its 700 entries.

A former director of Pakistan Institute of Development Economics and the head of Pakistan's Economic Affairs Division, Syed Nawab Haider Naqvi, (Note: During an "earlier phase" of the Islamic Banking movement in 1981) also called for "comprehensive Islamic reform to establish an exploitation-free economic system" and not just "mechanical substitution of profit for interest".

Zakat

On the issue of zakat, one of the pillars of Islam, M.A.Khan also criticizes the conservatism of Islamic Economics, complaining that "the insistence of Muslim scholars in implementing it in the same form as it was common practice in the days of the Prophet and the first four caliphs ... has made it irrelevant to the needs of a contemporary society."

Practicality

A supporter of Islamic economics (Asad Zaman) describes a "major difficulty" faced by Islamic reformers of Islamic economics and pointed out by other authors, namely that because a financial system is an "integrated and coherent structure", to create an Islamic system "based on trust, community and no interest" requires "changes and interventions on several different fronts simultaneously".

== See also ==
- History of Islamic Economics
- Autarky
- Capitalism and Islam
- Islamic socialism
- Islamic economics in Pakistan
- Islamic philosophy
- Economy of the OIC
- Female labor force in the Muslim world
- Law and economics
- State capitalism
- Corporatism
- Dirigisme
- Economics of fascism
- Economy of Malaysia
- Economy of Brunei
- Economy of Azerbaijan
- Economy of Kazakhstan
- Economy of Iran
- Economy of Jordan
- Economy of Saudi Arabia
- Islamic banking and finance
- Economic history of the Ottoman Empire
- Christian finance

People

- Taqi Usmani
- Nathif Jama Adam
