= Waleed El-Ansary =

Egyptian-American Islamic scholar

- Born: Waleed El-Ansary

Academic background
- Education: George Washington University, University of Maryland
- Influences: Seyyed Hossein Nasr

Academic work
- Institutions: Xavier University

Waleed El-Ansary is an Egyptian-American scholar of comparative religion, Islam and Islamic economics and the Helal, Hisham and Laila Edris El-Swedey University Chair in Islamic studies at Xavier University in Cincinnati, Ohio.

== Biography ==
El-Ansary graduated with a B.A. in economics in 1986 from George Washington University and received his M.A. in the same discipline from the University of Maryland in 1998. He earned his Ph.D. in human sciences in 2006 from George Washington University with a special concentration on Islamic studies. Ansary has served as an assistant professor of Islamic studies at the University of South Carolina and was an adjunct professor of Islamic Economics at Cordoba University's Graduate School of Islamic and Social Sciences. He was a research scholar at the Islamic Research Institute in Washington, D.C., and has also served as a consultant to the Royal Court of Jordan and the Grand Mufti of Egypt.

== Works ==
- The Spiritual Significance of Jihad in the Islamic Approach to Markets and the Environment (2006)
- Muslim and Christian Understanding: Theory and Application of A Common Word (2010)
- Knowing the Religion of the Other (first published in French as "Connaître la religion de l'Autres" in 2018) with Alexis Blum, Grand Rabbi Emeritus of Neuilly and Bishop Claude Dagens, Bishop of Angouleme (Sponsored by UNESCO)
- "Linking Ethics and Economics: The Role of Ijtihad in the Regulation and Correction of Capital Markets" (Occasional Paper) Center for Muslim-Christian Understanding Georgetown University (1999)
- "The Economics of Terrorism: How bin Laden is Changing the Rules of the Game" in Islam, Fundamentalism, and the Betrayal of Tradition (2004)
- "A perennialist perspective on religion and conflict" in European View (December, 2007)
- "Can Our Science and Economics Honor Nature?" in Renovatio (April, 2017)
- "Hindu and Islamic Economics: On the Need for a New Economic Paradigm" in the Muslim World, (April, 2017)
- Recovering the Islamic Economic Intellectual Heritage: Problems and Possibilities
- The Quantum Enigma and the Islamic Sciences of Nature.
- The Economics of Clash of Civilizations: Reexamining Religion and Violence

== See also ==
- Masudul Alam Choudhury
