= Azhar Qayyum =

Pakistani politician

Azhar Qayyum Nahra
- اظہرقیوم ناہرہ

Member of the National Assembly of Pakistan
- Incumbent
- Assumed office 18 February 2024
- Constituency: NA-84 (Gujranwala-VI)
- In office 13 August 2018 – 10 August 2023
- Constituency: NA-84 (Gujranwala-VI)
- In office 1 June 2013 – 31 May 2018
- Constituency: NA-100 (Gujranwala-VI)

Personal details
- Born: 1 January 1977 (age 49)
- Party: PMLN

Chaudhry Azhar Qayyum Nahra (Urdu: اظہر قیوم ناہرہ; born 1 January 1977) is a Pakistani politician who is a sitting member of National Assembly of Pakistan since February 2024. Previously he had been a member of the National Assembly of Pakistan from August 2018 till August 2023 and from June 2013 to May 2018.

== Early life ==
He was born on 1 January 1977.

== Political career ==
He ran for the seat of the National Assembly of Pakistan as a candidate of Pakistan Muslim League (N) (PML-N) from Constituency NA-100 (Gujranwala-VI) in by-elections held in 2010, but was unsuccessful. He received 61,818 votes and lost the seat to Chaudry Tussadiq Masud Khan. The seat had fallen vacant due to the resignation of Muddasir Qayyum Nahra.

He was elected to the National Assembly as a candidate of PML-N from Constituency NA-100 (Gujranwala-VI) in the 2013 Pakistani general election. He received 89,826 votes and defeated an independent candidate, Chaudhry Bilal Ijaz. During his tenure as Member of the National Assembly, he served as the Federal Parliamentary Secretary for Water and Power. In October 2017, he was made Federal Parliamentary Secretary for Postal Services.

He was re-elected to the National Assembly as a candidate of PML-N from Constituency NA-84 (Gujranwala-VI) in the 2018 Pakistani general election and defeated Chaudhry Bilal Ijaz for the second time consecutively.

He was re-elected to the National Assembly as a candidate of PML-N from Constituency NA-84 (Gujranwala-VI) in the 2024 Pakistani general election and defeated Chaudhry Bilal Ijaz for the third time consecutively. Following the 2024 Pakistani general election, the Lahore High Court set aside the notification of Nahra's win from NA-81 Gujranwala-V allowing a petition by PTI-backed independent candidate Chaudhry Bilal Ijaz. Supreme Court of Pakistan overturned The decision of Lahore High Court and reinstated Notification Declaring Azhar Qayyum Nahra as Winner
