= Rana Shamshad Ahmad Khan =

Pakistani politician

- رانا شمشاد احمد خاں

Minister for Excise and Taxation of the Punjab
- In office 1 December 2006 – 2007
- Governor: Khalid Maqbool
- Chief Minister: Chaudhry Pervaiz Elahi

Minister for Transport of the Punjab
- In office 4 January 2003 – 30 November 2006
- Governor: Khalid Maqbool
- Chief Minister: Chaudhry Pervaiz Elahi

Member of the Provincial Assembly of the Punjab
- In office 1 June 2013 – 31 May 2015
- Preceded by: Zulfiqar Bhindar
- Succeeded by: Chaudhry Akhtar Ali Khan
- Constituency: PP-100 (Gujranwala-X)
- In office 25 November 2002 – 18 November 2007
- Preceded by: New seat
- Succeeded by: Zulfiqar Bhindar
- Constituency: PP-100 (Gujranwala-X)
- In office 1997–1999
- Preceded by: Syed Muhammad Khalil-ur-Rehman Chishti
- Succeeded by: Seat dissolved
- Constituency: PP-83 (Gujranwala-VII)
- In office 1992–1993
- Preceded by: Chaudhry Abdul Wakeel Khan
- Succeeded by: Syed Muhammad Khalil-ur-Rehman Chishti
- Constituency: PP-83 (Gujranwala-VII)

Personal details
- Born: Chaudhry Shamshad Ahmad Khan; 5 May 1965 Kamoke, West Pakistan, Pakistan (now Punjab, Pakistan)
- Died: 31 May 2015 (aged 50) Kamoke, Punjab, Pakistan
- Cause of death: Assassination
- Party: Pakistan Muslim League (N)
- Other political affiliations: Pakistan Muslim League (Q)
- Parent: Chaudhry Abdul Wakeel Khan (father)
- Relatives: Chaudhry Akhtar Ali Khan (brother); Chaudhry Bilal Ijaz (brother-in-law)
- Occupation: Politician

Rana Shamshad Ahmad Khan (Urdu/Punjabi: رانا شمشاد احمد خاں; 5 May 1965 – 31 May 2015) was a Pakistani politician who was elected as a member of the Provincial Assembly of the Punjab four times. He served as an MPA from 1992 to 1993, 1997 to 1999, 2002 to 2007 and again from 2013 until his assassination in 2015.

== Early life and education ==
Rana Shamshad Ahmad Khan was born on 5 May 1965 in Kamoke, Pakistan. His father, Chaudhry Abdul Wakeel Khan was also a two-time MPA from the Punjab. Shamshad graduated with a Bachelor of Arts in 1987 and was an agriculturist by profession. He was married and had three children.

== Political career ==
During the 1990s, Shamshad served as an MPA in the Punjab from 1992 to 1993 and from 1997 to 1999. He was also the chairman of the Municipal Committee in Kamoke from 1992 to 1993, and nazim (mayor) of Kamoke Tehsil from 2001 to 2002.

He first became an MPA in 1992 from constituency PP-83 (Gujranwala-VII). His father had previously been elected from this constituency in the 1988 and 1990 general elections, for two consecutive terms. In the 1993 general election, Shamshad contested as a Pakistan Muslim League (N) (PML-N) candidate from PP-83. He received 23,030 votes and lost to Syed Muhammad Khalil-ur-Rehman Chishti, a PML-J candidate.

In the 1997 general election, Shamshad again contested as a PML-N candidate and was elected as an MPA from PP-83. He received 29,254 votes and defeated an independent candidate, Amanat Ali Virk.

In the 2002 general election, he was elected as an MPA from constituency PP-100 (Gujranwala-X) as a Pakistan Muslim League (Q) (PML-Q) candidate, when the PML-Q formed a government in the Punjab. He received 30,711 votes and defeated Haji Muhammad Aslam, a PPPP candidate. Shamshad was appointed as the provincial minister for transport from January 2003 to November 2006. In December 2006, he was appointed as the provincial minister for excise and taxation and held the post until 2007.

In the 2008 general election, he contested as a PML-Q candidate from PP-100. He received 21,638 votes and lost to Zulfiqar Bhindar, a PPP candidate.

In the 2013 general election, he joined the PML-N and was elected as an MPA for a fourth term, from PP-100. He received 54,118 votes and defeated Yasir Arafat Ramay, a PTI candidate. He remained in the seat until his death.

== Assassination ==
Shamshad was assassinated on 31 May 2015 in Kamoke along with his son, Rana Shahbaz, and an acquaintance, Mehmood Shakir. They were shot dead when armed assailants aboard a black vehicle opened fire on Shamshad's car while he was traveling home in the evening. The attackers fled the scene after the attack. The incident was condemned by prime minister Nawaz Sharif, who demanded an inquiry into the attack. Initial reports suggested that the alleged killers might have had a dispute over agricultural land with the victim. In June 2015, his attackers were reportedly arrested by police. In May 2016, another one of his alleged murderers was said to have been killed in a police encounter. In December 2018, one of the accused attackers was reported to have died in prison.

After Shamshad's death, his brother Chaudhry Akhtar Ali Khan won the by-election in constituency PP-100 and occupied the vacant seat.

Provincial Assembly of the Punjab
Preceded by Chaudhry Abdul Wakeel Khan	Member for PP-83 (Gujranwala-VII); 1992–1993	Succeeded by Syed Muhammad Khalil-ur-Rehman Chishti
Preceded by Syed Muhammad Khalil-ur-Rehman Chishti	Member for PP-83 (Gujranwala-VII); 1997–1999	Seat dissolved
New seat	Member for PP-100 (Gujranwala-X); 2002–2007	Succeeded by Zulfiqar Bhindar
Preceded by Zulfiqar Bhindar	Member for PP-100 (Gujranwala-X); 2013–2015	Succeeded by Chaudhry Akhtar Ali Khan
Political offices
Unknown	Minister for Transport of the Punjab; 2003–2006	Unknown
Unknown	Minister for Excise and Taxation of the Punjab; 2006–2007	Unknown
