= Rodney Wilson =

Rodney Wilson may refer to:

- Rodney Wilson (economist) (born 1946), British economist
- Rodney Wilson (museum director) (1945–2013), New Zealand art historian and museum professional
- Rodney Charles Wilson (educator) (born 1965), founder of LGBTQ+ History Month
