= Capitalism and Islam =

Islamic capitalism was active during the Islamic Golden Age and Arab Agricultural Revolution, where an early market economy and form of merchant capitalism took root between the 8th and 12th centuries. A vigorous monetary economy was based on a widely-circulated currency (the dinar) and the integration of monetary areas that were previously independent. Business techniques and forms of business organisation employed during this time included contracts, bills of exchange, long-distance international trade, forms of partnership (mufawadha) such as limited partnerships (mudharaba), and forms of credit, debt, profit, loss, capital (al-mal), capital accumulation (nama al-mal), circulating capital, capital expenditure, revenue, cheques, promissory notes, trusts (see Waqf), savings accounts, transactional accounts, pawning, loaning, exchange rates, bankers, money changers, ledgers, deposits, assignments, the double-entry bookkeeping system, and lawsuits. Organizational enterprises independent from the state existed in the medieval Islamic world, while agency institutions were also introduced. Many of these early capitalist concepts were adopted and advanced in medieval Europe from the 13th century onwards. Some have argued that these economic activities laid the foundations for the development of modern capitalism.

== Market economy ==
A market economy was established in the Islamic world based on an economic system resembling merchant capitalism. Capital formation was promoted by labour in medieval Islamic society, and a considerable number of owners of monetary funds and precious metals developed financial capital. The Qur'an prohibited Riba (usury), but this did not hamper the development of capital in any way. The capitalists (sahib al-mal) were at the height of their power between the 9th and 12th centuries. Still, their influence declined after the arrival of the ikta (landowners) and after the state monopolized production, both of which hampered industrial capitalism's development in the Islamic world. Some state enterprises still had a capitalist mode of production, such as pearl diving in Iraq and the textile industry in Egypt.

During the 11th–13th centuries, the "Karimis", an early enterprise and business group controlled by entrepreneurs, dominated much of the Islamic world's economy. The group was controlled by about fifty Muslim merchants labelled as "Karimis" who were of Yemeni, Egyptian, and sometimes Indian origins. Each Karimi merchant had considerable wealth, ranging from at least 100,000 dinars to 10 million dinars. The group had considerable influence in the most important eastern markets and sometimes politics through its financing activities and through various customers, including Emirs, Sultans, Viziers, foreign merchants, and common consumers. The Karimis dominated many trade routes across the Mediterranean Sea, Red Sea, and Indian Ocean, and as far as Francia in the north, China in the east, and sub-Saharan Africa in the south, where they obtained gold. Strategies employed by the Karimis include using agents, financing projects as a method to acquire capital, and a banking institution for loans and deposits. Another important difference between the Karimis and other entrepreneurs before and during their time was that they were not tax collectors or landlords, but their capitalism was due entirely to trade and financial transactions.

Though medieval Islamic economics appears to have somewhat resembled a form of capitalism, some Orientalists also believe several parallels exist between Islamic economics and communism, including the Islamic ideas of zakat and riba. Others see Islamic economics as neither completely capitalistic nor completely socialistic, but rather a balance between the two, emphasizing "individual economic freedom and the need to serve the common good." Others point out that Islam has an inherently capitalist nature and argue this most through respect for private property as the foundation of capitalism in Islam, as well as the historical fact that Muhammad was an entrepreneur, a merchant.

== Historical examples ==
Early forms of capitalism are thought to have been developed in the Islamic Golden Age, starting from the 9th century, and later became dominant in European Muslim territories like Al-Andalus and the Emirate of Sicily.

== Modern examples ==
The economy of Idlib under the rule of the Hay'at Tahrir al-Sham got described by Ahmed al-Sharaa as a free market model . The HTS weights Islamic capitalism. The organization's Islamic economic model is seen as closer to capitalism than communism, but with a strong social welfare system, some other describe it as economic system in some ways similar to the one of Erdoğan. The Islamic capitalism of the HTS also got described as pro-liberal economics or even as neoliberal. After the fall of the Assad regime the government supports free market economics. It was also reported that al-Sharaa embraced Fukuyamas version of free-market capitalism. As of September 2026, the transition is still going on.

== See also ==
- Islamic socialism
- Religious views on capitalism
