= Islamic economics in Pakistan =

The economic policies proposed under the banner of "Islamisation" in Pakistan include executive decrees on Zakāt (poor-due), Ushr (tithe), judicial changes that helped to halt land redistribution to the poor, and perhaps most importantly, elimination of riba (defined by activists as interest charged on loans and securities). Perhaps the foremost exponent of Islamisation among Pakistan's rulers—General Muhammad Zia-ul-Haq—advanced a programme in 1978 to bring (according to Zia and his supporters) Pakistan law in line with the principles of Sharia law.

Conceived in late 1977 and carried out during his reign, the programme came in response to an upsurge in Islamic activism, and the problems and controversies associated with the policies of Zia's predecessor, Prime Minister Zulfikar Ali Bhutto. Zia's stated intention was to "eradicate the scourge of interest" on loans and securities, and create an "interest-free economy". On January 1, 1980, approximately 7,000 interest-free counters were opened at all the nationalized commercial banks, making Pakistan the first country in the Muslim world with Islamic banking.

However, in spite of the public support allegedly demonstrated for it (and other Islamisation policies) by the 1984 Islamisation referendum and the programme's initial gains and success, it failed to achieve international targets and to meet commercial interactions with other major international banks. Islamic activists were also displeased that Zia's ordinances and proclamations did not ban interest paying accounts.

Zia's successors were not as active in their pursuit of Islamisation. While conservative Prime minister Nawaz Sharif publicly supported Islamisation, his economic policies focused on privatization and economic liberalization. Many Pakistani economists and business people worry that attempting to impose an Islamic economy on Pakistan would have "devastating economic, political, and social consequences for the country", though others (such as governor of the State Bank of Pakistan, Ishrat Husain), have termed fears of Islamlisation "absurd" and based on Western stereotypes. Islamisation has continued through the efforts of the Islamic courts Zia created, including activists on the Shariat Appellate Bench of the Supreme Court, although it was given a setback when the government of Pervez Musharraf came to power and pressured a number of activist judges to retire.

== History and background ==
As a state created specifically for Muslims, Pakistan has long had Islamic activists advocating for more thorough Islamisation of that country, and specifically for the elimination of riba (defined as interest on loans). But the country has also had Islamic modernists and secularists in positions of influence and "generations of Muslim usage and custom supported by the fatwa of respected ulema that held low rates of interest to be acceptable, non-usurious, and not riba", according to economist Feisal Khan. Even Allama Iqbal "the Thinker of Pakistan" (Mufakkir-e-Pakistan) "cited approvingly" the fact that Muslim princely states in India did not restrict modern banking or "attempt to impose some sort of `Islamic` concept of interest-free financial transactions." (Note: in his Presidential Address to the annual meeting of the All-India Muslim League in 1930) Consequently enthusiasm for Islamisation has waxed and waned throughout Pakistan's history. It has been strong when "religious elements are in ascendancy", such as during partition, the 1977 Nizam-e-Mustafa movement, and during the rise in fundamentalist after 2000. At other times "only lip service" is paid to the issue. Maududi and other Islamist hoped to make Pakistan "a new Medina" which would become "the leader of the Islamic world in the twentieth century, a laboratory where experiments in Islamic modernity would be successfully conducted en route' to ushering a new Islamic renaissance".

Ashraf Qureishi and Abul A'la Maududi, two of the pioneer theoreticians of Islamic banking, who preached that interest was riba, forbidden to Muslim, and "laid the foundations of current" Islamic Banking and Finance in the 1940, were from South Asia. (Maududi moved to Pakistan where he became an influential Islamist leader.) According to Feisal Khan, "South Asians in general and Pakistanis in particular are `over-represented`" among Islamic Banking "theorist and practitioners," and Pakistanis are "found in Islamic banks and financial firms throughout the [Persian] Gulf at all levels, from tellers to the boardroom."

Article 28 of Pakistan's 1956 Constitution called for the elimination of riba "as early as possible". The 1962 Constitution provided in the principles of policy that "usury" should be abolished. Similar provisions were found in the 1973 Constitution. In 1969 the state-sponsored advisory body known as the Council of Islamic Ideology (CII), declared that Pakistan's banking system was "fundamentally based upon riba", and unanimously called for its elimination.

The mid and late 1970s were a time of Islamic revivalism throughout parts of the Muslim world, including Pakistan. Zia's predecessor, leftist Prime Minister Zulfikar Ali Bhutto faced economic problems of stagflation and opposition to his programme of nationalization and land reform. In 1976 and 1977, vigorous opposition to Bhutto's policies united under the revivalist banner of Nizam-e-Mustafa ("Rule of the prophet") and preached that establishing an Islamic state based on sharia law would bring a return to the justice and success of the early days of Islam when the Islamic prophet Muhammad ruled Muslims. In an effort to stem the tide of street Islamization, Bhutto also called for Islamisation and banned the drinking and selling of wine by Muslims, nightclubs and horse racing. Confrontation between Bhutto's PPP and the opposition Pakistan National Alliance, street protests, loss of life and property, all preceded the military overthrow of Zulfikar Ali Bhutto by Zia in 1977. On coming to power, Zia committed himself to enforcing Nizam-e-Mustafa, a significant turn from Pakistan's predominantly secular law, inherited from the British.

Less than two years after the coup, Pakistan's Shia neighbor, Iran, saw a very unexpected Islamic revolution overthrow its well-financed pro-Western, secular monarchy. The new self-proclaimed revolutionary Islamic Republic of Iran believed in the necessity of Islamic sharia law for Islam to survive and prosper, and in the need to spread this doctrine to other Muslim states. Part of the Islamic revival revolution, created a new conflict in the Islamic world by pitting revolutionary Shia Iran against its doctrinal and geopolitical rival the conservative Wahhabi Kingdom of Saudi Arabia, for leadership of the Islamic world. As a poor, predominantly Sunni country, Pakistan has been closely tied to the petroleum-exporting Saudi Arabia which has employed many Pakistani guest workers. This competition for influence affected many things in Muslim countries, including economic policies.

=== Timeline of riba and banking ===
- 1956 - first constitution of Pakistan states that the state was to "eliminate riba as early as possible" (article 29(f)), but does not define riba.
- 1969 - the Council on Islamic Ideology recommends that riba be abolished and the banking system be overhauled, recommendation is ignored by the government.
- 1971 - the Council on Islamic Ideology recommends that riba be abolished and the banking system be overhauled, recommendation is also ignored by the government.
- 1979, July - interest is eliminated from three financial institutions by order of General Zia. Effective 1 July 1979, General Zia declared that the affairs of the National Investment Trust, the House Building Finance Corporation, and the Investment Corporation of Pakistan were to be run on an interest-free basis through the adoption of profit-loss sharing (PLS).
- 1980, detailed Report on the Elimination of Interest from the Economy 1980, is issued by the Central Institute of Islamic Research at the request of ruling General Zia-ul-Haq. Calls for a complete elimination of interest in Pakistan's economy over a five-year period.
- 1991, November - "monumental decision" by Federal Shariat Court of Pakistan overturning 20 federal and provincial financial laws as repugnant to Islam, forbids riba absolutely without exceptions. Tanzil-ur-Rehman having been brought out of retirement and appointed chief justice of the FSC, rules the financial Islamisation of Zia inadequate.
- 1999 - decision upheld by Shariah Appellate Bench finding financial Islamisation of Zia inadequate. After much stalling by the government and bureaucracy, the Faisal case was upheld by the Shariah Appellate Bench of the Supreme court (SAB) in the Aslam Khaki decision, with detailed orders to start the interest free economy.
- 1999 - SAB gives Pakistan government an additional year to Islamise. Pleading that implementation of the judgment would "create enormous problems" for the domestic, western-style banking and the economy, as well as Pakistan's "official and private business and financial dealings with the outside world", the government was given an additional year to Islamise by the Bench.
- 2002, May 24 - SAB is reconstituted by new President General Pervez Musharraf. With one Islamist removed and two new ulema judges added by order of Musharraf.
- 2002 June 24 - decision by reconstituted SAB to "set aside" 1999 ruling banning all interest on bank loans. 1999 case is sent back to Federal Shariat Court (FSC) for "definitive finding on all the issues ..."
- 2002 - "Reboot" of Islamic Banking. State Bank of Pakistan declares that banks and "windows" made "Islamic" as part of General Zia's 1979 Islamisation are not truly Islamic, but conventional. No new conventional banks are to be allowed in Pakistan. Banks (such as Meezan Bank and Al Baraka Bank) are converted into "full-fledged" Islamic commercial banks, following global Shariah-compliance standards with Shariah Boards, but also following conventional global banking norms such as the Basel Accords.

== Policies and difficulties ==
Despite its success in initial first five years, the programme was fractured in many obvious reasons, and the stagflation again began to bite the country's resources, as well as many technical and scientific problems arise in the new economic system that the military government and Zia-ul-Haq himself was unable to solve. The newly elected, but technocratic government of Prime minister Mohammad Khan Junejo refused to pass the new and more stricter version of Sharia bill. Zia abruptly dismissed the government on May 29, 1988, and the dissolved parliament the next day, alleging a slow pace of Islamization, corruption, deterioration of law and order, and mismanagement of the economy.

=== Banning Riba, building Islamic banking ===
General Zia declared that effective 1 July 1979 the affairs of the National Investment Trust, the House Building Finance Corporation, and the Investment Corporation of Pakistan were to be run on an interest-free basis through the adoption of profit and loss sharing finance (PLS). On January 1, 1980, he appeared on national television and announced the introduction of a "Profit and Loss Sharing System", according to which account holders were to share the losses and profits of the bank.

In 1980 the Council of Islamic Ideology issued a report with "detailed and far reaching reforms" to eliminate interest. The military government employed Islamic scholars and economists led by professor Khurshid Ahmad to compile laws about Islamic financing. Zia's government responded to the council's report by replacing interest-bearing savings accounts with PLS instruments in Pakistan's five state banks. The government also introduced and encouraged such banks to adopt financing schemes based upon the principles of mudaraba and or musharaka.

- Murabaha is a practice in which the "lender" (usually a bank) purchases, in its own name, goods that the borrower (usually an importer or trader) wants, and then sells the goods to him at an agreed mark-up. The technique is used for financing trade, but because the bank takes title to the goods, and is therefore engaged in buying and selling, its profit derives from a real service and entails a degree, albeit minimal, of risk.
- Musharaka is a practice in which the "lender" (usually a bank) enters into a partnership with the borrower/client in which both share the equity capital—and perhaps even management—of a project or deal, and both share in the profits or losses according to their equity shareholding.

However these Islamisation policies did not include a ban on interest-paying accounts and "in most instances" Pakistani banks continued to offer accounts with fixed interest rates. For example, for term deposits, the banks substituted the phrases 'rate of interest' with 'expected rate of profit' and "kept the entire regime of interest-based deposits intact."

While the Federal Shariat Court (FSC) — established by General Zia to, among other things, examine existing laws and strike down those that did not comply with Shari'a law (Note: He also established a Shariat Appellate Bench of the Supreme Court to be the final authority in Shariat cases.)—would have been the way to put a stop to such interest-paying accounts, Zia had created an article in the constitution (203B) which specifically removed from the FSC's jurisdiction "fiscal law or any law relating to the levy and collection of taxes and fees or banking or insurance practice and procedure", until government deemed it appropriate to withdraw the ban.

Furthermore, after the death of general Zia-ul-Haq, this programme was neglected by his long-time opponent Prime minister Benazir Bhutto, while Zia ally Nawaz Sharif launched a twin intensified programme, Privatization programme and the economic liberalisation to promote the GDP growth rate as well as reverting the economy back to Westernized economic system. (Note: See:the pages of Privatization programme and the economic liberalisation)

To surmount this obstacle, Islamic activists worked to

1. educate or convince the public that an interest-free economy was both viable and religiously necessary
2. pass a bill to make the shariat "superordinate" to the constitution
3. encourage superior courts to expand their definitions of jurisdiction of shariat to constitutional questions

Education

Muslims agree that the Quran condemns Riba, but do not all agree over what riba is.

While Muslim activists (and most Pakistanis) agree that riba is interest on debt, others believe that riba is usury (unethical loans that unfairly enrich the lender) and not interest charged under state-regulated banking practices. Such people were to be found disproportionately among "the economists, bankers, politicians, and bureaucrats" who "would be responsible to administer an interest free system".

To convince these people and others, Jamat-e-Islami and like-minded groups have sponsored, and Saudi Arabia has financed, numerous symposia "dedicated to the task of defining the modalities of an interest-free economy." A "vibrant" and abundant literature has emanated from these conferences, but many mainstream economists have remained unpersuaded. Activists also had no luck getting a law enacted to make the constitution subordinate to shariat, but had more luck in the courts.

Superior Courts

While Zia had blocked the shariah courts ability to ban interest with Article 203B, he had also added Article 2A (also known as the Objectives Resolution) to the constitution, which included the statement that Muslims' lives should be ordered "in the individual and collective spheres in accordance with the teachings and requirements of Islam as set out in the Holy Quran and Sunnah." One superior court judge known as a particularly "skillful" Islamic activist and judicial activist -- Tanzil-ur-Rahman—argued that Article 2A required shariat law be enforced and was a "supra-Constitutional" grund norm of law in Pakistan, which meant that it gave superior courts jurisdiction to overrule parts of laws otherwise protected by the constitution if they are in violation of article 2-A, unless that court was specifically excluded. (Article 203B specifically excluded the FSC from examining fiscal laws for repugnancy to Islam, but not the high courts.) Several decisions handed down in the late 1980s and early 1990s supported Tanzil-ur-Rahman's interpretation, but most high court justices did not subscribe to his application of the Objectives Resolution, nor to a ban on interest, and Tanzil-ur-Rehman retired from the bench in 1990.

Faisal Case

However, in 1990, the Benazir Bhutto government was dismissed by the president and Tanzil-ur-Rehman was brought out of retirement and appointed chief justice of the FSC. In November 1991 in a "monumental decision" he overturned 20 federal and provincial financial laws as repugnant to Islam.

The decision forbade riba absolutely without exceptions, defined it as "any addition, however slight, over and above the principal", including any system of markup, any indexing for inflation, payment by value rather than kind. It forbid riba in "production loans" as well as "consumptive" loans. It specifically declared invalid two Islamic Modernist interpretations that avoided strict prohibition: considering anti-riba Quranic verses (2:275-8) allegorical, and use of ijtihad (independent reasoning) of the issue based on finding the public good (maslaha).

The government was publicly committed to Islamisation, but also pursuing a liberalization of Pakistan's economy and had a semi-autonomous state bank file an appeal. After much stalling by the government and bureaucracy, the Faisal case was upheld in 1999 by the Shariah Appellate Bench in the Aslam Khaki decision, with detailed orders to start the interest free economy. Pleading that implementation of the judgment would "create enormous problems" for the domestic, western-style banking and the economy, as well as Pakistan's "official and private business and financial dealings with the outside world", the government was given an additional year to Islamise by the Bench.

By this time, however, Pervez Musharraf had staged a coup and come to power and limited the power of the courts. He required judges to take a "fresh oath of office" in which they would undertake to uphold the "Provisional Constitution Order" established by the coup, which required judges to not "make any order against the Chief Executive or any other person exercising powers or jurisdiction under his authority." Two justices of the Shariah Appellate Bench resigned rather than take the oath, a new appeal with new judges found many "errors" in the Aslam Khaki case and overturned the ruling of a couple months earlier.

Aftermath

In Pakistan's financial sector, as of 2006, a system of Islamic banking has been adopted that operates in parallel with the conventional banking system. Pakistanis can choose between the two modes of financing. Most informed Pakistanis, however, insist that there is "no concerted move" to do away altogether with the conventional banking system, or to replace existing linkages and relationships with international financial markets.

As of March 2014, the new "rebooted" Islamic banking sector made up 9.4% of Pakistan's banking assets, but like the old Islamic banking sector is still overwhelmingly based on markup, not profit and loss sharing. As of 2015 the Faisal case decision that banned all interest on bank loans but was sent back to Federal Shariat Court (FSC) for "definitive finding on all the issues ..." in 2002 remains unheard in the Federal Shariat Court.

Islamic activists (such as M. Akram Khan), maintained that Islamic banking and economics had "effectively failed" because of lack of "political will", ignorance of Islamic banking's "potential", the "inexperience" of the banking sector, failure to interest the public, etc.

Studies of industry and customers

Critic and economist Feisal Khan has noted that the Islamic banking industry in Pakistan has been supply driven rather than demand driven (mandated by General Zia-ul-Haq, court rulings, and the State Bank of Pakistan, rather than by customer interest or popular movements). In a series of interviews conducted in 2008 and 2010 with Pakistani banking professionals (banker in conventional and Islamic, Shariah banking advisors, finance-using businessmen, and management consultants), Khan noted many Islamic bankers expressed "cynicism" over the different or lack thereof between conventional and Islamic bank products, the lack of requirements for external Shariah-compliance audits of Islamic banks in Pakistan, shariah boards lack of knowledge of un-shariah compliant practices in their banks or power to stop these practices. However this did not deter patronage by the pious (one of whom explained that if his Islamic bank was not truly shariah compliant, 'The sin is on their head now, not on mine! What I could do, I've done.')

One estimate of banking customer preference (given by a Pakistani banker) was that out of the entire Pakistani banking sector, was that about 10% of customers were "strictly conventional banking clients", 20% were strictly Shariah-compliant banking clients, and 70% would prefer Shariah-compliant banking but would use conventional banking if "there was a significant pricing difference". A survey of Islamic and conventional banking customers found (unsurprisingly) Islamic banking customers were more observant (having attended hajj, observing salat, growing a beard, etc.), but also had higher savings account balances than conventional bank customers, were older, better educated, had traveled more overseas, and tended to have a second account at a conventional bank. (Note: Survey of 5133 bank customers of 30 branches of an Islamic and a conventional bank led by Ayesha Khalid Khan) Another study, using "official data" reported to State Bank of Pakistan, found that for lenders who had taken out both Islamic (Murabaha) financing and conventional loans, the default rate was more than twice as high on the conventional loans. Borrowers were "less likely to default during Ramadan and in big cities if the share of votes to religious-political parties increases, suggesting that religion – either through individual piousness or network effects – may play a role in determining loan default." (Note: a study of "conventional and Islamic loans using a comprehensive monthly dataset from Pakistan that follows more than 150,000 loans over the period 2006:04 to 2008:12".)

Criticism

Other economists had different and more critical explanations and observations. In 2000, the Governor of the State Bank of Pakistan, Ishrat Hussain contended that "Pakistan is far removed from the day when it will be ready to adopt a full-fledged Islamic economic system. ... Most of the assumptions and premises on which the (scientific) hypotheses about the Islamic economic system have been constructed are serious flawed... " A report by the IMF noted that the government has been unable to formulate non-interest based instruments for financing budget deficits, "thus the government, which is the major exponent of the implementation of the Islamic system, is forced to raise funds through borrowing on the basis of a fixed rate of return".

Another critic of "Islamization" of the economy, Feisal Khan, argues that one reason for the failure of the equity investment proposed by Islamic finance proponents to catch on is the "long established consensus" that debt finance is superior to equity investment because accurately determining the credit-worthiness of the borrower/investee is both time consuming and expensive, and much more crucial for equity investors than debt lenders. The quality and quantity of such information is particularly problematic when tax evasion is high and the underground economy large. This is very much the case in Pakistan where the 2005 incidence of tax evasion was between 5.7 and 6.5% of GDP, and the size of the unofficial/underground economy as between 54.6 and 62.8 percent of GDP, "among the world's highest". (The average size of the informal economy is about 30% in Asia.)

Economist Izzud-Din Pal argues that "Islamising" the economy in Pakistan cannot be seen apart from the wider attempt of regimes and political elites with low levels of legitimacy and popularity to use religion to win public support. Unfortunately, according to another author Yoginder Sikand, "rather than focusing on the Islamic imperatives of equality and social justice, which are so central to the Qur’anic text, successive regimes in Pakistan have sought to focus on particular economic injunctions of the Qur’an abstracted from wider issues of justice and equality". Because the debate on "Islamising" Pakistan's national economy has been reduced to issues related to interest-free banking, the abolition of riba (interest), the laws of inheritance and the levy of the "zakāt", Sikand believes all that is being offered are "magical solutions" to the complex modern problems of Pakistan's economy.

Feisal Khan also argues that instituting a strictly Islamic banking system of mudaraba and musharaka, as called for by the 1999 Aslam Khaki decision of the Shariah Appellate Bench could lead to financial catastrophe. If murabaha and other fixed income instruments were banned and replaced by the more "authentic" profit and loss sharing, banks could only finance enterprise by taking "a direct equity state" as called for in mudaraba and musharaka. Credit would contract and central banks would be unable to prevent a liquidity crisis by buying bonds, commercial paper, etc. to expand credit.

=== Land reform and Islamisation ===
Land ownership is concentrated in Pakistan — as of 2015 a reported one-half of rural households in Pakistan are landless, while 5% of the country's population owns almost two-thirds of its farmland. (Note: Only 5 percent of the country's population owns almost two-thirds (64 percent) of its farmlands. ...about one-half (50.8 percent) of rural households are landless -- a direct result of a feudal system that has existed for centuries. ... That bit of data came from The Society For Conservation and Protection of The Environment (SCOPE), a Pakistan-based NGO.) Some reformers believe concentrated land ownership plays a part in "maintaining poverty and food insecurity" in Pakistan, and several attempts have been made to redistribute land to peasants and landless (laws created in 1959, 1972 and 1977). However, most provisions of these laws have been overruled as un-Islamic by Pakistan courts.

The first attempts at land reform in Pakistan occurred under Ayub Khan's government in 1959, were successfully opposed by the landed elite who mobilized the Islamist party, Jamaat-e-Islami to defend the "sanctity of private property in Islam".

In 1971 when Zulfikar Ali Bhutto and the Pakistan People's Party came to power, land reforms were "at the center" of that government's plans to transform Pakistan in to a "democratic Islamic socialist" state. The regime issued two land reform laws. A 1972 law (Martial Law Regulation - MLR 115, "promulgated" by the Prime Minister rather than passed by the National Assembly) was designed to place ceilings on the agricultural holding of Pakistan's large landlords (usually 150 acres but 300 acres if the land was unirrigated; exceptions were granted for tractors or installed tubewells). Land was to be seized by the state without compensation and distributed to the landless. Another provision of the law gave "first right of pre-emption" (right of first refusal to buy the land) to the existing tenants. In 1977, a bill was passed by the National Assembly, reducing the ceiling still further to 100 acres—although this act provided for compensation to landlords.

The implementation of land reforms was criticized for the modest amount of land seized and redistributed to the peasants, less-than-equitable administration—implementation was much more robust in the NWFP and Balochistan, where opposition to Bhutto was centered—and for being inherently "un-Islamic." Many of Pakistan's large landlords mobilized against the reforms which they saw as "a direct challenged to their long-standing interest in maintaining political control in Pakistan's rural areas".

Undoing

After Zulfikar Ali Bhutto was overthrown, landlords who had lost as a result of land reform appealed to "Islamic Courts" (i.e. the Shariah Appellate Bench and Federal Shariat Court), established by Bhutto's successor General Zia-ul-Haq, and these, rather than the executive or legislature of Pakistan, undid much of Zulfikar Ali Bhutto's reform program. According to scholar Charles H. Kennedy, the courts effectively "suspended implementation" of the land reforms, "repealed the reforms, drafted new legislation, and then interpreted the new laws' meanings".

"In early 1979, the "Shariat Bench" of the Peshawar High Court" found the section of the 1972 law granting tenants the right to buy land they worked before other offers ("right to preemption") was "repugnant to Islam" and thus void. The petitioners against the law had successfully argued that "nowhere in the Holy Quran or Sunnah" was there mention of a tenant's right to preemption. The right to preemption according to the a hadith (the recorded reports of the teachings, deeds and sayings of the Islamic prophet Muhammad that make up much of the Sunnah) according to the petitioners and judges of the Shariat Bench went instead to the

1. shafi sharik (in Shariat law, "cosharers" or co-owners of the land)
2. shafi khalit ("participants in immunities and appendages", i.e. those sharing special right on the property such as right of passage, right of irrigation, etc.,);
3. shafi jar (contiguous owners, those "owning an immovable property adjacent to the immovable property sold").

This decision was reaffirmed by the Federal Shariat Court in 1981 (although the court acknowledged that "Islam recognized the validity of state imposed limits on wealth for the purpose of alleviating poverty or providing for the public good", which was a goal of the land reform laws), and upheld by the Shariah Appellate Bench of the Supreme Court in 1986 in a 3 to 2 decision. This decision was "clarified and reclarified" in subsequent decisions, (but confusion over what land transfers were valid or not under the "old law" remained since legal proceedings with "final decree" prior to the August 1986 ruling remained valid (Note: for example, over 5000 cases on pre-emption were pending before provincial courts in Punjab.)).

In August 1989 the Shariat Appellate Bench struck down several more measures of the 1972 land reform law. It ruled unanimously that provisions that allowed the confiscation of land without compensation were un-Islamic. On other measures it divided 3 to 2. It ruled that Waqf (an Islamic religious endowment, typically a donated plot of land or building) land was exempt from any provision of land reform laws; that the ceilings on amount of land owned were an undue restriction on property rights, on the grounds that "Islam does not countenance compulsory redistribution of wealth or land for the purpose of alleviating poverty, however laudable the goal of poverty relief may be." (Note: As of 2014, this ruling appears to have remained in effect according to: Butt, Aamir. "Ibtidah Current Affairs Social Development Creative Writing Photo Journalism Inspiration Philosophy and Natural Sciences LAND REFORMS IN PAKISTAN-A REVIEW". laaltain.com. Archived from the original on 3 January 2015.) Dissenting justices argued that under Islam the rights of property holder must be balanced against the needs of the community. The repudiation of a major feature of Zulfikar Ali Bhutto's domestic policies during the regime of his daughter underscoring judicial independence (i.e. power), and the weakness of the elected government.

According to barrister writing in dawn.com, "The net result of the Qazalbash Waqf v Chief Land Commissioner (the 1989 Shariat Appellate Bench decision) is that land reforms in Pakistan are now at the same level as they were in 1947, as the 1972 regulations and the 1977 act have seen their main provisions being struck down and the 1959 regulations have been repealed."

=== Other issues ===
Other ordinances dealing with Islamic finance included the Zakāt and Ushr Ordinances issued on 20 June 1980, to Islamize taxation. The new system expelled the secular and international financial institutions and consisted only Islamic organizations, associations and institutions. The Zakāt was to be deducted from bank accounts of Muslims at the rate of 2.5% annually above the balance of Rs. 3,000. The Ushr was levied on the yield of agricultural land in cash or kind at the rate of 10% of the agricultural yield, annually.

Authorized by General Zia-ul-Haq, the government appointed Central, Provincial, District and Tehsil Zakat Councils to distribute Zakat funds to the needy, poor, orphans and widows. The Shia Muslims were exempted from Zakat deduction from their accounts due to their own religious beliefs. According to critics (Arskal Salim) the program has not been a great success:

"Since it was introduced through the Zakat and Ushr Ordinance No. 17 of 1980 ... the real lives and economic conditions of millions of Pakistani citizens have been completely unchanged, but a great number of socioreligious and political problems have arisen from state involvement in zakat administration."

Another economist (Parvez Hasan) writing in 2004 states zakat collections were insufficient to help the poor as it makes up only "0.17 percent of GDP ... Rs. 5-6 billion". The present level of grants "would add only 5-6 percent" to the income of the 1.2 million of the poorest Pakistani households even if every rupee of zakat collected went directly to these poor.

== See also ==
- Zia-ul-Haq's Islamisation
- Islamic economics in the world
- Privatization in Pakistan
- Economic liberalisation in Pakistan
