= Abdul Azim Islahi =

Abdul Azim Islahi (born 1950) is a professor at the Islamic Economics Institute, Jeddah. He has spent more than 30 years in research, teaching and expanding the frontiers of the discipline of Islamic economics, King Abdulaziz University. He obtained his PhD from the Aligarh Muslim University, India in 1981. He is an authority on the history of Islamic economic thought.

He has written 18 books and more than 100 research papers, book reviews and articles in English, Arabic and Urdu. He has contributed four articles to the Encyclopaedia of Islamic Economics (London, 2009). His distinct contribution is filling the research gap in the history of Islamic economic thought by series of studies covering from the 1st century AH/7th century CE to 13th century AH/19th century CE. His research papers have appeared in professional and refereed international journals such as History of Political Economy; History of Economic Ideas; Islam and Christian-Muslim Relations; Journal of King Abdulaziz University: Islamic Economics; Journal of Research in Islamic Economics, Thoughts on Economics (Dhaka, Bangladesh), Hamdard Islamicus, Quarterly Journal of the Pakistan Historical Society, Review of Islamic Economics, IIU Journal of Economics and Management, American Journal of Islamic Social Sciences, Islamic Economic Studies and Journal of Objective Studies.He is the chairman of Indian Association for Islamic Economics
