= Chaudhry Akhtar Ali Khan =

Pakistani politician

Member of the Provincial Assembly of Punjab
- Incumbent
- Assumed office 24 February 2024

Personal details
- Party: PMLN (2015-present)

Chaudhry Akhtar Ali Khan is a Pakistani politician who had been a Member of the Provincial Assembly of the Punjab from August 2018 till January 2023. Previously, he was a Member of the Provincial Assembly of the Punjab, from July 2015 to May 2018. In 2024 elections became Kamoki city's first man to win three consecutive elections.

Chaudhry Akhtar Ali Khan is a Pakistani politician who was a Member of the Provincial Assembly of the Punjab, from July 2015 to May 2018 and won the seat again in 2018 general elections representing Pakistan Muslim League (Nawaz). His father Ch Abdul Wakeel Khan was a two time member of parliament Punjab (Independent once) and his deceased brother Ch Shamshad Ahmad Khan was a four time member of parliament and a minister for transport and excise in Punjab, a responsibility in which Ch Akhter Ali Khan played the front most role as to the allocation of both portfolios. His co-father-in-law is Rana Muhammad Iqbal previously longest serving speaker in Punjab Assembly and a caretaker governor of Punjab and is currently member of parliament Punjab representing Pakistan Muslim League (Nawaz) from Kasur, Phoolnagar.

== Early life and education ==
He was born on 1 April 1957.

He graduated in 1978 from University of the Punjab.

== Political career ==
He was elected to the Provincial Assembly of the Punjab as a candidate of Pakistan Muslim League (Nawaz) (PML-N) from Constituency PP-100 (Gujranwala-X) in by-polls held in July 2015.

He was re-elected to Provincial Assembly of the Punjab as a candidate of PML-N from Constituency PP-61 (Gujranwala-XI) in the 2018 Pakistani general election.

His brother, Rana Shamshad Ahmad Khan served as the Punjab minister for transport and excise from 2002 to 2008. Akhter Ali Khan's father, Chaudhry Abdul Wakeel Khan served as a member of the Punjab provincial assembly from 1988 to 1992.
