= Abu al-Faḍl Jaʻfar ibn ʻAli al-Dimashqi =

Muslim merchant and author

Abū al-Faḍl Jaʻfar ibn ʻAlī al-Dimashqī (Arabic: أبو الفضل جعفر بن علي الدمشقي; fl. 12th-century) was a prosperous Muslim merchant from Damascus. He is best known for being the author of Kitab al-Isharah ila Mahasin at-Tijarah wa Marifat Jayyid al-Aʼrad wa Kadiiha wa Ghush-ush al-Mudallisin fiha (A Guide to the Merits of Commerce and to Recognition of Both Fine and Defective Merchandise and the Swindles of Those Who Deal Dishonestly).

Almost nothing is known about al-Dimashqi's life. He was among the Muslim writers who were influenced by Greek sources, particularly by the neo-Pythagorean Bryson of Heraclea.

== Economic views ==
In contrast to many other Muslim writers, Al-Dimashqi approved of wealth for its own sake. His work praises trade as an economic activity and demonstrates a thorough understanding of the roles of supply and demand and the uncertainty associated with them. According to Louis Baeck, professor of International Economics and Development at the Catholic University of Leuven (Belgium), al-Dimashqi "formulated what modern economists would call price theory". In this theory, al-Dimashqi "makes a distinction between normal periods in which market prices are based on cost of production, as opposed to periods of scarcity or oversupply, in which speculators' drive manifest itself".

In the Guide to the Merits of Commerce, he expresses disapproval of the state becoming directly involved in the economy. Al-Dimashqi also emphasizes the necessity of division of labour for economic development:

"No individual can, because of the shortness of his life span, burden himself with all industries. If he does, he may not be able to master the skills of all of them from the first to the last. Industries are all interdependent. Construction needs the carpenter and the carpenter needs the ironsmith and the ironsmith needs the miner, and all these industries need premises. People are, therefore, necessitated by force of circumstances to be clustered in cities to help each other in fulfilling their mutual needs"

== See also ==
- Islamic economic jurisprudence
- Islamic economics in the world
- Ibn Khaldun
