= Zakat Council =

Organization responsible for collecting and distributing Islamic taxes in Pakistan

Zakat Councils are responsible for collecting and distributing the Islamic taxes known as Zakat and Ushr in Pakistan. The councils are overseen by the Ministry of Religious Affairs. In Pakistan, the system of compulsory collection and distribution of Zakat and Ushr began in 1980, with an ordinance decreed by General Muhammad Zia-ul-Haq calling for a 2.5% annual deduction from personal bank accounts on the first day of Ramadan, with the revenue to be used for poverty relief.

The ordinance was officially promulgated by President Zia-ul-Haq alongside Muhammad Abdullah during a ceremony at Lal Masjid in June 1980.

== Taxes ==
=== Zakat ===
Zakāt (Arabic: زكاة "that which purifies"), is the giving of a fixed portion of one's wealth to needy people, and is one of the Five Pillars of Islam. (Zakat purifies the wealth of a Muslim, (according to Surah At-Tawba, Ayat 60 in the Quran), and several a hadith.)

In Pakistan Zakat is levied on sahib-e-nisab, i.e. a person who owns or possesses assets liable to Zakat under Shariah equal to or more than nisab, (about US $300, calculated according to the value of 612.32 grams of silver). There are eleven types of assets liable to Zakat "detailed in 1st schedule of Zakat & Ushr Ordinance 1980".

=== Ushr ===
Ushr is collected on compulsory basis at a rate of 5 percent of the produce from every landowner, grantee, allottee, lessee, lease-holder or land-holder unless they fail to meet the definition of sahib-e-nisab, (producing more than 849 kilograms of wheat, or its equivalent in value. Farmers who produce less are called mustahiq).

Ushr was intended to replace the land tax (revenue) levied by provinces. The law was amended so that Shia Muslim and non-Muslim landowners would continue to pay the land revenue tax.

== Zakat Councils ==
The Zakat Councils are at federal, provincial and district levels in Pakistan. (There are no Ushr Councils, Ushr goes to Zakat Councils.) According to the provincial Government of Punjab, the collection of Zakat and Ushr and maintenance of relevant accounts is administered by the federal "Ministry of Religious Affairs (MORA). It is credited in Central Account No. 08-Central Zakat Fund, maintained with the State Bank of Pakistan Karachi, and disbursed to Provincial Zakat Council which in turn transfer it to District Zakat Committees (DZCs). In Punjab the zakat reportedly goes to programmes such as: "Guzara Allowances", Educational Stipend to the Students of Educational Institutions and religious schools (Deeni Madaris), Health Care, Rehabilitation, "Marriage of Musthaiq (beneficiaries) Girls and Stipends to Musthaiq students" of technical institutions.

=== Issues ===
According to one critic (Arskal Salim):

"Since it was introduced through the Zakat and Ushr Ordinance No. 17 of 1980 ... the real lives and economic conditions of millions of Pakistani citizens have been completely unchanged, but a great number of socioreligious and political problems have arisen from state involvement in zakat administration."

Problems include a depersonalization and religious delegitimization of zakat as a tax, and increased sectarian and political infighting. The change from an act of voluntary piety to compulsory government collection, meant some Sunni Muslims felt they had not met their religious obligation by see the tax. Others began to evade the tax by transferring their taxable funds shortly before Ramadan to accounts of those who were exempt from the tax (foreigners, non-Sunnis, etc.). In the first days of the tax, Shia Muslims who followed the Ja'fari jurisprudence school of fiqh raised strong opposition, and in April 1981, the government made an exemption allowing Shia to file for exemptions. This was met with opposition from conservative Sunni Ulama (religious scholars) who were afraid that some Sunni Muslims "would convert to Shi'i for purposes of zakat evasion". Zakat Councils and their funds being a significant source of political and economic power, Pakistani political parties began to compete over control of the councils.

== Criticism ==
In hospitals the Zakat money is given only for the treatment of Muslim patients and is not given for poor non-Muslim patients, who receive from a general donation fund instead. This practice is highly criticised by even people inside the Zakat Council. The Sindh Zakat Council Chairman said that the Zakat money should be given to all needy without discriminating on the basis of religion. The Zakat collection is based on Islamic Sharieh principles, so this amount should also be paid on that on the said principles.

== See also ==
- Zakāt
- Sadaqah
- Zakat al-fitr, a different form of zakat which follows the pillar of Sawm (fasting in Ramadan).
- Khums
- Islamic economics in Pakistan
