= Chaudhry Abdul Wakeel Khan =

Pakistani politician

Member of the Provincial Assembly of the Punjab
- In office 1990–1992
- Constituency: PP-83 Gujranwala-VII
- In office 1988–1990
- Constituency: PP-83 Gujranwala-VII

Personal details
- Born: Chaudhry Abdul Wakeel Khan
- Party: Islami Jamhoori Ittehad
- Relatives: Chaudhry Akhtar Ali Khan (son); Chaudhry Shamshad Ahmad Khan (son)

Chaudhry Abdul Wakeel Khan (Urdu/Punjabi: چوہدری عبدالوکیل خان) was a Pakistani politician who was twice elected as a member of the Provincial Assembly of the Punjab. He served as an MPA from 1988 to 1990 and from 1990 to 1992 from constituency PP-83 (Gujranwala-VII).

== Political career ==
Chaudhry Abdul Wakeel Khan hailed from Kamoke in the Gujranwala District of Punjab, Pakistan. In the 1988 general election, he contested as an independent candidate from constituency PP-83 (Gujranwala-VII) and was elected as an MPA. He received 16,815 votes and defeated Sardar Zulfiqar Ahmad Khan, a PPP candidate.

In the 1990 general election, he contested as an IJI candidate from PP-83 and was again elected as an MPA. He received 38,778 votes and defeated his opponent Sardar Zulfiqar Ahmad Khan, then representing the PDA, by a large margin. He held the seat until 1992, following which his son Chaudhry Shamshad Ahmad Khan contested in elections from this constituency.

During his time in politics, Abdul Wakeel developed a close working relationship with Nawaz Sharif.

== Personal life ==
Abdul Wakeel's sons, Chaudhry Akhtar Ali Khan and Chaudhry Shamshad Ahmad Khan, have both served as elected MPAs in the Punjab provincial assembly from their home constituency. Shamshad was most recently serving as MPA for constituency PP-100 (Gujranwala-X) until his assassination on 31 May 2015, following which Akhtar contested in the by-election for the vacant seat and won.

There is a Chaudhry Abdul Wakeel Khan Road and a sports ground, known as Chaudhry Abdul Wakeel Khan Stadium, named after him in Kamoke.
