= Masudul Alam Choudhury =

Bangladeshi economist

Masudul Alam Choudhury Professor
- Born: January 1, 1948 (age 78); Kolkata, India
- Occupation: Professor of Economics
- Awards: ⦿Adèle Mellen Prize ⦿COMCEC award, Organisation of Islamic Cooperation, Jeddah, Saudi Arabia ⦿International Islamic Social Science Award, Qom, Iran ⦿Farabi International Award, Tehran, Iran ⦿Rockefeller Foundation Award, Bellagio, Italy

Academic background
- Education: University of Dhaka; Quaid-i-Azam University; University of Toronto

Academic work
- Discipline: Islamic Economics and Finance
- Institutions: University of Toronto; Cape Breton University; Trisakti University; Sultan Qaboos University; King Fahd University; King Abdulaziz University; National University of Malaysia; University of Regina; Trent University
- Notable ideas: Tawhid (monotheistic law) and the Islamic socio-scientific world-system

Masudul Alam Choudhury (born January 1, 1948) is a Bangladeshi-Canadian economist and International Chair in Islamic Economics and Finance at the Faculty of Economics, Trisakti University in Jakarta, Indonesia.

== Biography ==
Masudul Alam Choudhury was born in Calcutta, India on January 1, 1948. He attended the universities of Dhaka, Islamabad, and Toronto for his advanced education in mathematics and economics, earning a PhD from the University of Toronto in 1977. He moved to Canada from Bangladesh and taught economics at Cape Breton University in Sydney, Nova Scotia, Canada for twenty two years.

Apart from that, he has taught at various universities around the world, including the University of Toronto, Sultan Qaboos University (National University of Oman), King Fahd University, King Abdul Aziz University, Jeddah, National University Malaysia, University of Regina, and Trent University.

== Contributions to academia ==
Although an economist and mathematician by training, Professor Choudhury has contributed to the associated fields of finance, sociology and the philosophy of economics (participative dynamics, circular causation, ethics and well-being). He is the founder of the epistemic field of Tawhid (monotheistic law) and the Islamic socio-scientific world-system, with extensive theoretical and applied studies in the corresponding fields of economics, society and science. In all these areas his focus for much of his career has been in the area of participatory dynamics related to diverse problems of economics, finance, and socio-scientific systems studied in the epistemic worldview. He taught economics for twenty-two years until his retirement from Cape Breton University, Nova Scotia, Canada, in 2008. He graduated with his Masters and Ph.D. from the University of Toronto in 1977. Professor Dr. Masudul Alam Choudhury presently lectures on the Post-Graduate Program in Islamic Economics and Finance in the Faculty of Economics, Trisakti University, Jakarta, Indonesia. He offers Ph.D. level subjects, namely, Islamic Epistemology of Economics and Finance; Islamic Microeconomic Theory; Islamic Macroeconomic Theory; Advanced Islamic Economics and Finance; and Islamic Comparative Development Studies. He is also the Editor-in-Chief of the Journal of Critical Realism in Socio-Economics (JOCRISE). This international journal is published by the University of Darussalam Press, Gontor, Indonesia.

== Works ==
- The Principles of Islamic Political Economy: A Methodological Enquiry
- The Islamic World-System: A Study in Polity-Market Interaction
- Money in Islam: A Study in Islamic Political Economy
- Contributions to Islamic Economic Theory: A Study in Social Economics
- Alternative Perspectives in Third World Development: The Case of Malaysia with Uzir Abdul Malik, Mohammad Anuar Adnan
- Comparative Development Studies: In Search of the World View.
- Islamic Economic Cooperation
- Meta-Science of Tawhid: A Theory of Oneness
- Islamic Economics and Finance: An Epistemological Inquiry
- Comparative Economic Theory: Occidental and Islamic Perspectives
- Islamic Financial Economy and Islamic Banking
- The Foundations of Islamic Political Economy with Uzir Abdul Malik
- Islamic Economics as Mesoscience: A New Paradigm of Knowledge
- Absolute Reality in the Qur'an
- God-Conscious Organization and the Islamic Social Economy
- Studies in Islamic social sciences
- Islamic World View
- Tawhid and Shari'ah: A Transdisciplinary Methodological Enquiry
- The Universal Paradigm and the Islamic World-system: Economy, Society, Ethics and Science
- Islamic Economics: Theory and Practice
- Reforming Muslim World
- Heterodox Islamic Economics: The emergence of an ethico-economic theory
- Islamic Economics and COVID-19. The Economic, Social and Scientific Consequences of a Global Pandemic
- Advanced Exposition of Islamic Economics and Finance
- Methodological Dimension Of Islamic Economics
- Knowledge and the University: Islam and Development in the Southeast Asia Cooperation Region
- Tawhidi Epistemology and Its Applications: Economics, Finance, Science, and Society
- Economic Theory and Social Institutions: A Critique with Special Reference to Canada
- Science and Epistemology in the Koran: Methodological issues and themes in the Koran
- Circular Causation Model in the Koran
- Explaining the Qurʼan: A Socio-scientific Inquiry. Winner of the Adèle Mellen Prize (2002).
