= Umer Chapra =

Pakistani-Saudi economist (1933–2026)

- عمر چھاپرا
- Born: 1 February 1933; Bombay, Bombay Presidency, British India
- Died: 13 June 2026 (aged 93); Mecca, Saudi Arabia
- Resting place: Jannat al-Mu'alla, Mecca, Saudi Arabia
- Occupation: Economist
- Notable work: Islam and the Economic Challenge, The Future of Economics: An Islamic Perspective
- Spouse: Khairunnisa Jamal Mundia (m. 1962)
- Children: 4
- Awards: King Faisal International Prize (1990)

Muhammad Umer Chapra (Arabic: محمد عمر شابرا; 1 February 1933 – 13 June 2026) was a Pakistani-Saudi economist. He was an economic advisor at the Islamic Research and Training Institute (IRTI) of the Islamic Development Bank (IDB) in Jeddah, Saudi Arabia, as well as the Saudi Arabian Monetary Agency (SAMA) where we worked for nearly 35 years.

== Early life and education ==
Muhammad Umer Chapra was born in Bombay, British India on 1 February 1933 and grew up in Karachi after the partition of India. He completed undergraduate studies from the University of Sindh in 1950, followed by undergraduate and postgraduate degrees in commerce at the University of Karachi in 1954 and 1956 respectively. He then moved to the United States, where he pursued a PhD in economics and sociology from the University of Minnesota in 1961, and worked as an academic for six years.

== Career ==
In 1965, Chapra moved to Saudi Arabia after being offered an economic advisory position at the Saudi Arabian Monetary Agency (SAMA). He was among the first Pakistani nationals to move to the Kingdom. He worked under Minister for Finance Sheikh Mohammed Abalkhai during the reign of King Faisal, and played an instrumental role in building Saudi Arabia's banking system, as well as formulating the government's economic and monetary policies over the next several decades. In 1990, he was awarded the King Faisal International Prize in the field of Islamic studies and economics. He was also granted Saudi citizenship in recognition of his services to the country.

In 1995, he was awarded an Institute of Overseas Pakistanis medal by the President of Pakistan, for his contributions in economics.

== Personal life and death ==
Chapra was married to Khairunnisa Jamal Mundia and they had four children.

Chapra died on 13 June 2026 at the age of 93. His funeral prayer was held on 14 June 2026 at Masjid al-Haram in Mecca, after which he was buried at Jannat al-Mu'alla.

== Awards and recognition ==
- Islamic Development Bank Award for Islamic Economics (1989).
- King Faisal International Prize for Islamic Studies (1990).
- The IOP (Institute of Overseas Pakistanis) gold medal by the President of Pakistan for services to Islam and Islamic Economics at the First IOP Convention in Islamabad (1995).
- Ranked by ISLAMICA 500 among the Top 50 Global Leaders in Islamic Economics in 2015.

== Bibliography ==
Chapra wrote extensively on the issues of Islamic economics and finance. He published around 15 books and monographs and more than 90 articles and book reviews, of which the following have been among the most notable:

- Towards a Just Monetary System
- Islam and the Economic Challenge
- The Future of Economics: An Islamic Perspective
- The Islamic Vision of Development in the Light of Maqasid Al-Shari'ah
- Muslim Civilization: The Causes of Decline and the Need for Reform
- Morality and Justice in Islamic Economics and Finance
- Al-Iqtisad Wa Al-Akhlaq (2011)
- Al-Hadharah Al-Islamiyah: Asbab Al-Inhitat Wa Al-Hajah Ela Al-Eslah (2012)
