= Excise & Taxation Department (Punjab, Pakistan) =

Government department

The Excise, Taxation & Narcotics Control Department is a department of Government of Punjab, Pakistan. The Excise, Taxation & Narcotics Control Department collects various taxes and duties and suggests ways and means for additional resource mobilization in the Province.

Various type of taxes department collects include:

- Motor Vehicle Tax
- Property Tax
- Excise Duty
- Professional Tax
- Entertainment Duty
- Luxury House Tax on Houses & Farm Houses
- Cotton Fee

== See also ==
- Ministry of Finance (Pakistan)
- Department of Revenue (Pakistan)
- Federal Board of Revenue
- Finance Department
- Economy of Punjab
