= Chaudry Tussadiq Masud Khan =

Pakistani politician

Chaudry Tussadiq Masud Khan (born November 19, 1959, in Gujranwala) was a Member of the National Assembly of Pakistan from 2010 to 2013. He was elected from his native Constituency NA-100 after the seat was vacated by Mudasir Nahra, who was disqualified. Khan is a member of the Standing Committee for Food and Agricultural Affairs and is an agriculturist by professions. He also owns a poultry farm, flour mill and a chain of CNG stations. He is affiliated with the Pakistan Peoples Party. He is also a former Union Council member and Tehsil Nazim.
