= Rodney Wilson (economist) =

Rodney James Alexander Wilson (born 1946 in Belfast) is a British economist and Emeritus Professor of Economics at Durham University; where he co-founded the university’s Master's program in Islamic Finance. He is known for his expertise on Islamic economics. Wilson was among the first to systematically explore how Islamic banking could be integrated within modern financial institutions. His critiques of internal contradictions in Islamic finance have been influential in academic debates. In the later years of his academic career, Wilson was recognized as a leading scholar in Islamic finance, receiving accolades including an award from the Islamic Development Bank.

== Published ==
1. Economic Development in the Middle East. Routledge, 1995.

2. The Politics of Islamic Finance (Editor). Edinburgh University Press, 2004.

3. Islamic Finance in Europe: Towards a Plural Financial System. Edinburgh University Press, 2007.

4. Islam and Economic Policy: An Introduction. Edinburgh University Press, 2020.

5. Islamic Economics: A Short History. In The New Palgrave Dictionary of Economics, 2006.

6. Shari'ah-Compliant Finance. In Handbook of Islamic Banking, edited by Kabir Hassan and Mervyn Lewis, Edward Elgar, 2009.
