= Shoukat Ali Laleka =

Pakistani politician (1960–2023)

Provincial Minister of Punjab for Zakat and Ushr
- In office 13 September 2018 – 9 April 2022

Member of the Provincial Assembly of the Punjab
- In office 15 August 2018 – 14 January 2023
- Constituency: PP-238 Bahawalnagar-II
- In office 29 May 2013 – 31 May 2018
- Constituency: PP-278 (Bahawalnagar-II)

Personal details
- Born: 1 January 1961 Bahawalnagar, Punjab, Pakistan
- Died: 8 September 2023 (aged 63) Lahore, Punjab, Pakistan
- Party: PTI (2018–2023); PMLN (2013–2018); PPP (2008–2013); PML-Q (2001–2008); PMLN (1997–1999); Independent(1993–1996); Islami Jamhoori Ittehad (1988–1993); Pakistan Muslim League (1985–1988)
- Children: Inam Bari (son)

Shoukat Ali Laleka (Urdu: شوکت علی لالیکا; 1 January 1960 – 8 September 2023) was a Pakistani politician. He was a provincial minister of Punjab for Zakat and Ushr from 13 September 2018 to April 2022, and a member of the Provincial Assembly of the Punjab from August 2018 to January 2023. From May 2013 to May 2018 he was a member of the Provincial Assembly of the Punjab.

== Early life ==
Shoukat Ali Laleka was born on 1 January 1961 in Bahawalnagar.

== Political career ==
Laleka was elected to the Provincial Assembly of the Punjab as a candidate of Islami Jamhoori Ittehad (IJI) from PP-226 (Bahawalnagar-II) in the 1990 Pakistani general election. He received 21,077 votes and defeated an independent candidate, Muhammad Tariq Amin Hotiana.

Laleka ran for the seat of the Provincial Assembly of the Punjab as an independent candidate from PP-226 (Bahawalnagar-II) in the 1993 Pakistani general election but was unsuccessful. He received 37 votes and lost the seat to Noor Muhammad Ghaffari, a candidate of the Pakistan Muslim League (N) (PML-N). In the same election, he ran for the seat of the National Assembly of Pakistan as an independent candidate from NA-144 (Bahawalnagar-I) but was also unsuccessful. He received 502 votes and lost the seat to Mian Abdul Sattar Laleka, a candidate of the PML-N.

Laleka was re-elected to the Provincial Assembly of the Punjab as a candidate of the PML-N from PP-226 (Bahawalnagar-II) in the 1997 Pakistani general election. He received 27,467 votes and defeated Mian Manzoor Ahmed Mohal, a candidate of the Pakistan Peoples Party (PPP).

Laleka was re-elected to the Provincial Assembly of the Punjab as a candidate of the PML-N from PP-278 (Bahawalnagar-II) in the 2013 Punjab provincial election. He received 38,673 votes and defeated Syed Nazar Mehmood Shah, an independent candidate.

Laleka was re-elected to Provincial Assembly of the Punjab as an independent candidate from PP-238 (Bahawalnagar-II) in the 2018 Punjab provincial election.

Laleka joined the Pakistan Tehreek-e-Insaf (PTI) following the election.

== Provincial Minister ==
On 12 September 2018, he was inducted into the provincial Punjab cabinet of Chief Minister Usman Buzdar. On 13 September 2018, he was appointed Provincial Minister of Punjab for Zakat and Ushr.

== Death ==
Shoukat Ali Laleka was injured in a traffic accident on his way to Islamabad. He was moved to a hospital in Lahore where he underwent treatment and later died on 8 September 2023. He was 62. His wife was also killed in the accident.
