= NA-81 Gujranwala-V =

Constituency of the National Assembly of Pakistan

NA-81 Gujranwala-II
- Constituency for the National Assembly of Pakistan
- Region: Nowshera Virkan Tehsil, (partly) including Kamoke city of Gujranwala District
- Electorate: 437,879

Current constituency
- Party: Pakistan Muslim League (N)
- Member: Azhar Qayyum
- Created from: NA-100 Gujranwala-VI; NA-98 Gujranwala-IV

NA-81 Gujranwala-II (این اے-81، گوجرانوالہ-2) is a constituency for the National Assembly of Pakistan.

== Members of Parliament ==
=== 2018–2023: NA-84 Gujranwala-VI ===
Election	Member	Party
2018	Azhar Qayyum	PML(N)

=== 2024–present: NA-81 Gujranwala-V ===
Election	Member	Party
2024	Azhar Qayyum	PML(N)

== Election 2002 ==
General elections were held on 10 October 2002. Chaudhry Bilal Ijaz of PML-Q won by 73,107 votes.

General election 2002: NA-100 Gujranwala-VI
Party	Candidate	Votes	%	±%
PML(Q)	Ch. Bilal Ijaz	73,107	54.99	
PML(J)	Hamed Naser Chattha	49,255	37.05	
MMA	Muhammad Ehsan Ullah	8,375	6.30	
Others	Others (two candidates)	2,205	1.66	
Turnout		138,474	49.32	
Total valid votes		132,942	96.01	
Rejected ballots		5,532	3.99	
Majority		23,852	17.94	
Registered electors		280,754		

== Election 2008 ==
General elections were held on 18 February 2008. Mudassar Qayyum Nahra an independent candidate won by 57,320 votes.

General election 2008: NA-100 Gujranwala-VI
Party	Candidate	Votes	%	±%
Independent	Mudassar Qayyum Nahra	57,320	38.26	
PML(Q)	Ch. Bilal Ijaz	53,285	35.57	
PPP	Tariq Yaqoob Fateh Muhammad	32,511	21.70	
PML(N)	Ch. Ashfaq Ahmed Mattu	6,315	4.22	
Others	Others (two candidates)	371	0.25	
Turnout		158,190	48.06	
Total valid votes		149,802	94.70	
Rejected ballots		8,388	5.30	
Majority		4,035	2.69	
Registered electors		329,185		
Independent gain from PML(Q)				

== By-Election 2010 ==
By-Election 2010: NA-100 Gujranwala-VI
Party	Candidate	Votes	%	±%
PPP	Ch. Tassadaq Masud Khan	71,112	49.77	
PML(N)	Azhar Qayyum Nahra	66,901	46.82	
PML(Q)	Khalid Mahmood Manj	2,639	1.85	
Others	Others (eleven candidates)	2,244	1.56	
Turnout		144,216	43.80	
Total valid votes		142,896	99.09	
Rejected ballots		1,320	0.91	
Majority		4,211	2.95	
Registered electors		329,285		
PPP gain from Independent				

== Election 2013 ==
General elections were held on 11 May 2013. Azhar Qayyum Nahra of PML-N won by 89,826 votes and became the member of National Assembly.

General election 2013: NA-100 Gujranwala-VI
Party	Candidate	Votes	%	±%
PML(N)	Azhar Qayyum Nahra	89,826	49.94	
Independent	Ch. Bilal Ijaz	70,318	39.10	
Others	Others (twelve candidates)	19,701	10.96	
Turnout		185,169	64.23	
Total valid votes		179,845	97.12	
Rejected ballots		5,324	2.88	
Majority		19,508	10.84	
Registered electors		288,271		
PML(N) gain from Independent				

== Election 2018 ==
General elections were held on 25 July 2018.

General election 2018: NA-84 Gujranwala-VI
Party	Candidate	Votes	%	±%
PML(N)	Azhar Qayyum	119,612	47.62	
PTI	Chaudhry Bilal Ijaz	89,728	35.72	
Others	Others (ten candidates)	33,900	13.50	
Turnout		251,182	57.36	
Rejected ballots		7,942	3.16	
Majority		29,884	11.90	
Registered electors		437,879		
PML(N) hold		Swing	N/A	

== Election 2024 ==
General election 2024: NA-81 Gujranwala-V
Party	Candidate	Votes	%	±%
PML(N)	Azhar Qayyum	110,057	43.01	
PTI	Chaudhry Bilal Ijaz (Note: Filed nomination papers as PTI candidate but ECP allowed him to run as an independent)	106,860	41.76	
TLP	Zulfiqar Ali	18,555	7.25	
Others	Others (fourteen candidates)	20,424	7.98	
Turnout		273,667	52.02	
Total valid votes		255,896	93.51	
Rejected ballots		17,771	6.49	
Majority		3,197	1.25	
Registered electors		526,124		

== See also ==
- NA-80 Gujranwala-IV
- NA-82 Sargodha-I
