= Islamic taxes =

Taxes sanctioned by Islamic law

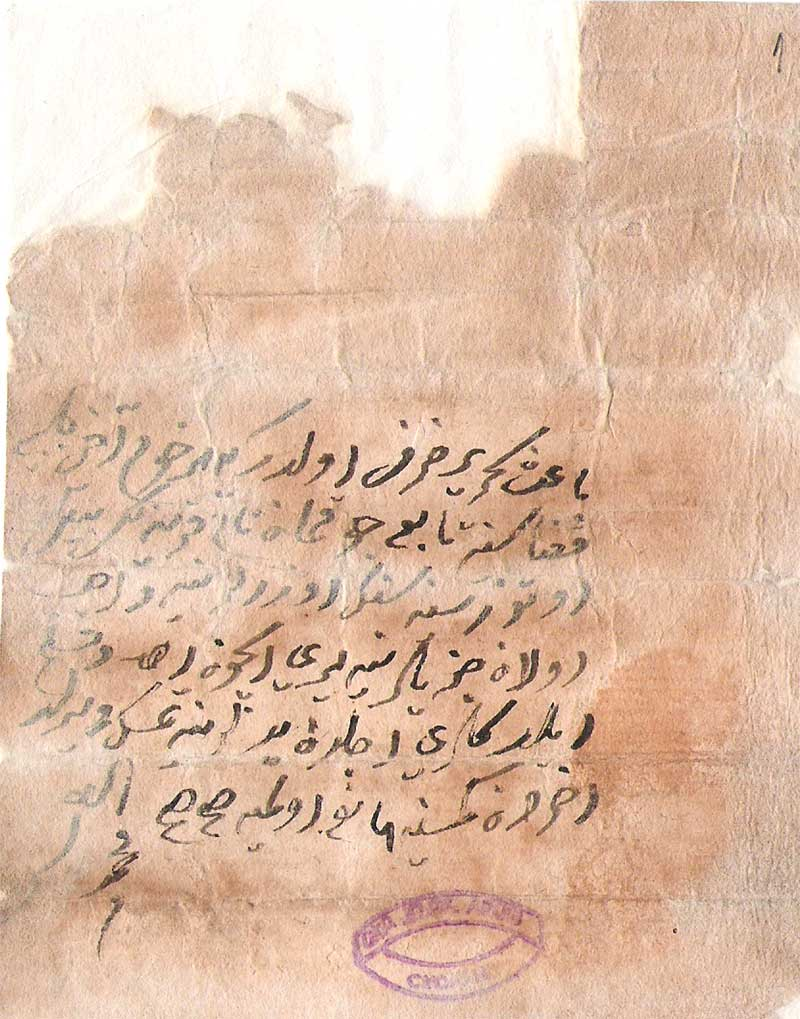

Islamic taxes are taxes sanctioned by Islamic law. They are based on both "the legal status of taxable land" and on "the communal or religious status of the taxpayer".

Islamic taxes include

- zakat - one of the five pillars of Islam. Only imposed on Muslims, it is generally described as a 2.5% tax on savings for charity. As stated in the Quran 9:60, "Indeed, [prescribed] charitable offerings are only [to be given] to the poor and the indigent, and to those who work on [administering] it, and to those whose hearts are to be reconciled, and to [free] those in bondage, and to the debt-ridden, and for the cause of God, and to the wayfarer. [This is] an obligation from God. And God is all-knowing, all-wise." Outlined in this verse are the 8 categories where Zakat is eligible.
- jizya - a per capita yearly tax historically levied by Islamic states on certain non-Muslim subjects—dhimmis—permanently residing in Muslim lands under Islamic law, the tax excluded the poor, women, children and the elderly. (see below)
- kharaj - a land tax initially imposed only on non-Muslims but soon after mandated for Muslims as well.For a time the kharaj led to an increased conversion rate for non-Muslims to avoid this additional tax.
- ushr - a 10% tax on the harvests of irrigated land and 10% tax on harvest from rain-watered land and 5% on land dependent on well water. The term has also been used for a 10% tax on merchandise imported from states that taxed the Muslims on their products. Caliph `Umar ibn Al-Khattāb was the first Muslim ruler to levy ushr.
- khums (Arabic: خُمْس Arabic pronunciation: [xums]) a tax of one-fifth (20%) of wealth acquired as the spoils of war; and, according to most Muslim jurists, other specified types of income, towards various designated beneficiaries. In Islamic legal terminology, "spoils of war" (al-ghanima) refers to property and wealth looted by the Muslim army after battling with or raiding non-Muslims.

The taxes stipulated by Islamic law generally did not generate enough revenue even for the limited expenditures made by pre-modern governments, and rulers were forced to impose additional taxes, which were condemned by the ulema.

According to scholar Murat Çizakça, only zakat, jizya and kharaj are mentioned in the Buktasira.

== Kharaj ==
The Kharaj (poll tax) was implemented early in Arab rule of Egypt as a tax placed on crop lands. Absorbed from the taxation systems under the Byzantines, the Kharaj was a 10% land tax measured in either surface area of crop land or the yield with additional value placed on ease of irrigation. Paid in cash or kind with no system to compensate farmers experiencing a lower yield, making cash the more forgiving method of payment. The taxed percentage of the farmers crop was impacted by the type of crop sown however the crops were zoned by the government not allowing farmers to choose the type of crop they cultivated. Agriculture on the Nile was so well regulated that the government knew how much revenue to expect from the Kharaj in advance based on measurements of Nile flooding from years prior.

Following a large increase in conversion in Khurasan the local governments left to be run by the Dahaqin (the leader of arab ruled persian settlements) the Dahaqin were having a hard time meeting their quotas and increased payments required on land taxes. This led to a mass revolt which after subsiding left the Dahaqin humiliated and led to them alleviating the fixed land tax from the Kharaj and taxing the “weak converts” the jizyah.

== Ushr ==
Ushur or ushr (Arabic: عشر), in Islam, is a 10% tax on the harvests of irrigated land and 10% tax on harvest from rain-watered land and 5% on land dependent on well water. Caliph Umar expanded the scope of ushr to include border trade tax. It literally means a tenth part, and it remained in practice in Islamic ruled territories from Spain and North Africa through India and Southeast Asia through the 18th century. Ushur was applied on traders, at a rate of 10% of the value of the merchandise that was either imported or exported across the border controlled by the Islamic state. It applied to non-Muslim traders as well, who were residents of the Islamic state (dhimmi), as well as to non-Muslim traders who were foreigners and wished to sell their merchandise inside the Islamic state. Historical medieval era trade documents between Oman and India, refer to this tax on ships arriving at trade port as ashur or ushur. Ushr and Jizya would grant non-Muslims a privilege in war time, i.e. non-Muslims could not be obliged to join in military activities in the event of a war. By paying taxes, non-Muslims were protected by the Islamic law from any harm (dhimmi- the protected one), as opposed to Muslims who had to pay Zakat as well as were obliged to join in military activities in order to protect Muslims and non-Muslims alike.
