= List of Union Councils of Gujar Khan Tehsil =

The tehsil of Gujar Khan, an administrative subdivision of Rawalpindi District in Punjab province, Pakistan, was administratively subdivided into 1 Municipal Committee and 36 Union Councils for the Local Bodies election of 2015. Municipal Committee is subdivided into 19 wards. The 36 Union Councils are

1. Ahdi
2. Bewal
3. Bhadana
4. Changa Bangial
5. Daultala-I
6. Daultala-II
7. Devi
8. Islampura
9. Gulyana
10. Ghungrila
11. Jand Mehlu
12. Jarmot Kalan
13. Jatli
14. Jero Ratial
15. Jhangi Jalal
16. Jhongal
17. Kalyam Awan
18. Kaniat Khalil
19. Krumb Ilyas
20. Kauntrila
21. Kuri Dolal
22. Mandra
23. Manghot
24. Mankiala Muslim
25. Matua
26. Mohra Nooril
27. Narali
28. Noor Dolal
29. Panjgran
30. Qazian
31. Ramman
32. Sahang
33. Sui Chemian
34. Sukho
35. Syed
36. Thathi
