= Bhata =

Digital village in Punjab, Pakistan

Coordinates: 33°25′7″N 73°18′5″E

Bhata بھاٹہ
- Digital village
- Interactive map of Bhata
- Country: Pakistan
- Province: (Punjab, Pakistan) Punjab
- Division: Rawalpindi
- District: Rawalpindi
- Tehsil: Gujjar Khan
- Union Council: Noor Dolal

Population (2022)
  - Total: 4,202
- Time zone: UTC+5 (PST)
- Postal Code: 47670
- Area code: 0513

Bhata is a Digital village in Gujar Khan Tehsil, Rawalpindi District in the Punjab province of Pakistan, which is located in the centre of Mandra-Chowk Pindori Road.

The village is at 8 km from GT (Grand Trunk) Road Mandrah. Majority of people are government employed like teachers, Punjab police, army, navy, air force, patwaris, traffic police etc.

== History of Bhata ==
Bhata is a historical village. There is a six-hundred-year-old cemetery and a mosque here. Some distance to the west of Bhata is the historical cemetery of Sardaran Ghakhran, whose total area was about eighty kanals. And the graves of his two brave brothers, Sher Khan Gakhar and Fateh Khan Gakhar, are in the four walls of the fort, which are blackened here. There are three arches on the western inner wall of Baristan's four walls, the central arch is large and the right and left ones are slightly smaller. There are round towers on the four corners. In 1580, Sulaiman Khan settled Bhata in the true sense. After the arrival of Sulaiman Khan, the Janjua Rajput's family settled here.

== Digital-enabled village ==
This is the 16th digital-enabled village in the country being monitored by the State Bank of Pakistan. Major commercial banks followed the State Bank's instructions and made arrangements to designate Bhata village as a Digital enabled village.

With the installation of an ATM facility, a drive was launched to motivate villagers to open bank accounts. Major banks including United Bank Limited, Allied Bank Limited, MCB Bank, Khushhali Microfinance Bank, and JazzCash attended the launching ceremony.

The Digital-enabled village scheme is an initiative of the State Bank. It aims to provide 100% financial literacy for the entire population, achieve 80% account opening, ensure 50% of the accounts are held by females, onboard all merchants and shops in the village through QR deployment, and install ATMs. The State Bank is carrying out these initiatives through partner commercial banks.

== Educational institutions ==
- Government Boys High School Bhata
- Government Girls High School, Bhata
- Government Primary School, Bhata (Non functional)
- Madrissa Jamia Masjid Ghousia Chistia, Bhata

== Location and geography ==
Bhata is located in the Gujjar Khan Tehsil.

Distance from nearby places
| Order | Name | Distance(KM) | Road name | Travel Time |
|---|---|---|---|---|
| 1 | Rawalpindi | 45 | Chowk Pindori | 1 hr 10 min |
| 2 | Rawalpindi | 50 | Mandra G.T. Road | 1 hr 23 min |
| 3 | Islamabad | 50 | Islamabad Highway | 1 hr 07 min |
| 4 | Gujar Khan | 23 | Mandra G.T. Road | 36 min |
| 5 | New Islamabad International Airport | 70 | Saddar, Rawalpindi | 1 hr 40 min |
| 6 | Kallar Syedan | 15 | Chowk Pindori | 22 min |
| 7 | Kahuta | 24 | Chowk Pindori | 44 min |

== Hospitals ==
- Basic Health Unit Ghousia Chowk

Basic Health Unit is 2.5 km away from Bhata.

== Post office ==
There is Post Office in Bhata.

| City / Town | Post Code | Tehsil / Tehsil P.O. | District / District / G.P.O. | Province |
|---|---|---|---|---|
| Mandrah/ Bhata | 47670 | Gujar Khan | Rawalpindi | Punjab |

== Telecommunication ==
The PTCL provides the main network of landline telephones. Many ISPs and all major mobile phone and wireless companies operating in Pakistan provide service in Bhata.

== Religion ==
Religion
| Religion | Percentage |
| Islam | 100% |

== Other villages near Bhata ==
- Kurizada Sawan کورزادہ سواں
- Mohra Nojo موہڑہ نوجو
- Mohra Dhamial موہڑہ دھمیال
- Azizpur Gujran عزیز پور گجراں
- Basanta بسنتہ
- Cheren جھیڑیں
- Noor Dolal نوردولال
- Gumti گمٹی
- Bishandot بشنڈوٹ
- Kuri Dolal کوری دولال
- Arazi Hasnaal اراضی حسنال
- Phalina پھلینہ

== Transport ==
- Bhata is situated on the Mandra-Chowk Pindori Road. Gujar Khan is about 18 kilometers away, Rawalpindi – Islamabad is about 45 kilometers, Mandra is 8 Kilometers, Rawat is 22 kilometers and Kallar Syedan is about 16 kilometers from Bhata. There are many ways to get around in Bhata, including public transport, buses, various kinds of private hire vehicles including vans, cars, taxis, and auto-rickshaws, motorcycles, and tractors.
- Mandra Junction railway station and Gujar Khan Railway Station are the nearest railway stations.
- Islamabad International Airport is located at a distance of 70 km from Bhata.
