= PP-8 Rawalpindi-II =

Constituency in Punjab, Pakistan

- Constituency for the Provincial Assembly of Punjab
- Region: Gujar Khan Tehsil (partly) including Gujar Khan city of Rawalpindi District

Current constituency
- Created from: PP-3 Rawalpindi-III

PP-8 Rawalpindi-II (پی پی-8، راولپنڈى-2) is a Constituency of Provincial Assembly of Punjab.

== Area ==
- Municipal Committee Gujjar Khan,
- Qazian Circle Union Councils
- Gujar Khan-I*
- Gujar Khan-II and
- Kauntrila Union Council of Gujar Khan Tehsil of Rawalpindi District.

== 2008—2013:PP-3 (Rawalpindi-III) ==
Provincial election 2008: PP-3 Rawalpindi-III
| Party | Candidate | Votes | % | ±% |
|---|---|---|---|---|
| PPP | Raja Tariq Kiani | 34,435 | 34.35 | |
| PML(N) | Iftikhar Ahmed Warsi | 33,764 | 33.68 | |
| PML(Q) | Ch. Javaid Kausar Advocate | 31,692 | 31.61 | |
| Pakistan Aman Party | Saeedain Khan Advocate | 254 | 0.25 | |
| Independent | Salim Akram | 110 | 0.11 | |
| Turnout | | 102,073 | 51.02 | |
| Total valid votes | | 100,255 | 98.22 | |
| Rejected ballots | | 1,818 | 1.78 | |
| Majority | | 671 | 0.67 | |
| Registered electors | | 200,061 | | |

== 2013—2018:PP-3 (Rawalpindi-III) ==
General elections were held on 11 May 2013. Iftikhar Ahmad won this seat with 58,916 votes.

Provincial election 2013: PP-3 Rawalpindi-III
| Party | Candidate | Votes | % | ±% |
|---|---|---|---|---|
| PML(N) | Iftikhar Ahmed | 58,916 | 49.31 | |
| PTI | Ch. Javed Kausar | 29,784 | 24.93 | |
| PPP | Raja Muhammad Tariq Kayani | 22,700 | 19.00 | |
| Independent | Raja Altaf Hussain | 2,590 | 2.17 | |
| TTP | Ch. Khayam Zaman | 1,516 | 1.27 | |
| Others | Others (ten candidates) | 3,972 | 3.32 | |
| Turnout | | 122,055 | 50.88 | |
| Total valid votes | | 119,478 | 97.89 | |
| Rejected ballots | | 2,577 | 2.11 | |
| Majority | | 29,132 | 24.38 | |
| Registered electors | | 239,891 | | |

== 2018—2023: PP-8 (Rawalpindi-III) ==
General elections are scheduled to be held on 25 July 2018. In 2018 Pakistani general election, Javed Kausar a candidate of Pakistan Tehreek-e-Insaf won PP-8 Rawalpindi III election by taking 48,221 votes.

Provincial election 2018: PP-8 Rawalpindi-III
| Party | Candidate | Votes | % | ±% |
|---|---|---|---|---|
| PTI | Javed Kousar | 48,221 | 33.87 | |
| PPP | Khurram Pervaiz Raja | 42,196 | 29.63 | |
| PML(N) | Chaudhary Muhammad Riaz | 34,647 | 24.33 | |
| TLP | Muhammad Ajmal Qureshi | 11,252 | 7.90 | |
| MMA | Raja Muhammad Jawwad | 2,045 | 1.44 | |
| Independent | Aftab Ahmad | 1,464 | 1.03 | |
| TLI | Muhammad Shakeel | 1,409 | 0.99 | |
| Others | Others (three candidates) | 1,156 | 0.81 | |
| Turnout | | 146,640 | 50.69 | |
| Total valid votes | | 142,390 | 97.10 | |
| Rejected ballots | | 4,250 | 2.90 | |
| Majority | | 6,025 | 4.24 | |
| Registered electors | | 289,303 | | |

== General elections 2024 ==
Provincial election 2024: PP-8 Rawalpindi-II
| Party | Candidate | Votes | % | ±% |
|---|---|---|---|---|
| Independent | Javed Kousar (Note: Filed nomination papers as PTI candidate but ECP allowed him to run as an Independent) | 47,531 | 31.61 | |
| PPP | Khurram Pervaiz Raja | 40,604 | 27.00 | |
| PML(N) | Iftikhar Ahmed | 27,578 | 18.34 | |
| TLP | Ismail Tariq Kiyani | 23,407 | 15.57 | |
| Independent | Amir Afzal Qureshi | 6,240 | 4.15 | |
| Others | Others (fifteen candidates) | 5,008 | 3.33 | |
| Turnout | | 155,566 | 45.88 | |
| Total valid votes | | 150,368 | 96.66 | |
| Rejected ballots | | 5,198 | 3.34 | |
| Majority | | 6,927 | 4.61 | |
| Registered electors | | 339,042 | | |
| hold | | | | |

== See also ==
- PP-7 Rawalpindi-I
- PP-9 Rawalpindi-III
