= Arazi Hasnal =

- Union council Kuri Dolal
- آراضی حسنال
- Country: Pakistan
- Province: Punjab
- District: Rawalpindi
- Tehsil: Gujar Khan

Population (2016 (estimated))
  - Total: 7,000

Arazi Hasnal is a small village in Union council Kuri Dolal near Mandrah in Gujar Khan, Rawalpindi, Punjab, Pakistan. It is located 10 km eastern side of historic Grand Trank Road crossing center of Mandrah town and located on Mandrah Gujar Khan Road passing through Mandhar Village.

There are two sub-locality in Arazi Hasnal:

- Dhoke Baba Hussain
- Dhoke Natha Rajjgan

There are two major tribes in Arazi Hasnal:

- Bangial Rajputs (Panwar Rajputs)
- Minhas Rajputs

== Notable residents ==
- Salman Akram Raja - Senior Advocate, Supreme Court of Pakistan
