= Wasla Bangial =

Coordinates: 33°23′N 73°19′E

Wasla Bangial وصلہ بنگیال
- Union council Kuri Dolal
- Interactive map of Wasla Bangial وصلہ بنگیال
- Country: Pakistan
- Province: Punjab
- District: Rawalpindi
- Tehsil: Gujar Khan

Population (2016 (estimated))
  - Total: 10,000

Wasla Bangial is a village in Union council Kuri Dolal near Mandrah in Gujar Khan, Rawalpindi, Punjab, Pakistan.

== Locality ==
Wasla Bangial village is located 12 km eastern side of historic Grand Trank Road crossing center of Mandrah town and located on Kalar Syedan Gujar Khan Road passing through Union council Darkali Mehmoori and village Daryal.

== Sub localities ==
Two sub localities of the village Wasla Bangial are:

- Chappar
- Dhoke Ghora

== Tribes ==
major tribes in Village Wasla Bangial,

- Bangial Rajputs (Panwar Rajputs)
- Meiyal Rajputs
- Alvi(qazi)
