= Paimal =

Pakistani village

Paimal پائمال پائمال شریف پائمال گکھڑاں
- Village
- Paimal sharief پائمال شریف
- Location within Pakistan
- Coordinates: 33°19′06″N 73°09′30″E
- Country: Pakistan
- Founder: Baba deewan Haji Hussain Shah

Area
  - Total: 10.0 km^{2} (3.9 sq mi)
- Elevation: 553 m (1,814 ft)

Population
  - Total: 3,000
- Postal code: 47701
- Area code: 051

Paimal is a village in the district of Rawalpindi, Gujar Khan Tehsil, Sahang Union Council, in the Punjab province of Pakistan It was founded by Baba Deewan Haji Hussain. It has multiple sub villages: Dhoke Pashoriyan, Mohra Sadal, Pindbala, Kali Pari, and Dhoke Bindi.

The major tribe of this village is the Gakhar clan, who cast the shrines of Baba Deewan Haji Hussain Shah and Baba Deewan Zahid Muhammad.

The Kala Kot fort of the Gakhars is also in this village.
