= Soura Khatril =

Village in Rawalpindi, Pakistan

Soura Khatril (urdu:سوڑہ کھتڑیل) is a Village of union council Ghungrila near Mandrah town, Tehsil Gujar Khan, District Rawalpindi in Pothohar region of Punjab, Pakistan

== Locality ==
Soura Khatril is located 4 km on eastern side of The historic Grand Trank Road which passes through the center of Mandrah town. There is main road link to Chakwal, Khushab and Sargodha from Mandrah.

== Tribes ==
Jaskham Khatril Tribe is major tribe of village Soura Khatril.A small number of Minhas also found in Soura.
