= Dhoke Qureshian =

noor dolal
- Village
- Country: Pakistan
- Province: Punjab (Pakistan)
- District: Rawalpindi
- Time zone: UTC+5 (PST)

Dhoke Qureshian (Dhoke Lamyan) is a sub village (Dhoke) of mohza Noordolal in Gujar Khan Tehsil, Punjab, Pakistan. This is a small sub village consists of many houses divided into main three portions i.e. Upera Mohallah, Bunna Mohallah and Parrian. There one main Eid Gah of area, one cricket ground manned by Qureshi Cricket Club, one government Girls Elementary school Noordolal, one flour chaki, one main Cemetery for four villages Arra, Jattu, Ghora Qureshian and Dhoke Qureshian. one main meadow of area, three drinking water wells, two poultry farms, one mosque and three shops.
