= Kuri Dolal =

Coordinates: 33°23′N 73°16′E

- Union council
- Interactive map of Kuri Dolal
- Country: Pakistan
- Province: Punjab
- District: Rawalpindi
- Tehsil: Gujar Khan

Government

Population
  - Total: 22,000

Kuri Dolal (Urdu: كُرى دولال) is a town in Gujar Khan Tehsil, Punjab, Pakistan. Kuri Dolal is also the chief town of Union Council Kuri Dolal, which is an administrative subdivision of the thesil.

== Towns and unions in the city district of Rawalpindi ==
- Bhata
- Noor Dolal
- Gumti
- Arazi Hasnal
- Kuri Dolal
- Tapyali khurd
- Saib
- Faisal Colloney
- Natha Dolal
- Ganja Mera
- Jahag
- Kala Pida
- Karali
- Kund
- Dharayala
- Mohra Gujran
- Jherian Arian
- Dhoke Maira
- Wasla Bangial
