= Nirali Jabair =

Narali Jabair is a village in the UC Changa Bangial, Gujar Khan Tehsil of Rawalpindi District, Punjab, Pakistan.

- Post Code 49764
- 33°19′31″N 73°23′54″E
