= Jameel Pura =

- Village
- Location in Pakistan Jameel Pura (Pakistan)
- Coordinates: 33°17′31.2″N 73°28′22.8″E
- Country: Pakistan
- Province: Punjab
- District: Rawalpindi
- Tehsil: Gujar Khan
- Union Council: Islampura Jabbar

Population
  - Estimate: 300+
- Time zone: UTC+5 (PST)

Jameel Pura is a small village near Islampura in the Rawalpindi District of Punjab. It is located 70 km (43 mi) south-east of Islamabad, Pakistan. Residents of Jameel Pura consist of some natives and many descendants of Kashmiri and Rajput families which left Azad Kashmir due to the construction of the Mangla Dam in 1960. The construction of the Mangla Dam caused a large-scale exodus of natives when outlying areas surrounding Mirpur and Dadyal were flooded, it was reported that well over 400 surrounding villages were submerged. Jameel Pura has 1 local mosque as well as a public cemetery, a dozen shops, and around 40 houses. The estimated population of the village is 300.
