= Dhoke Habib, Mandra =

Dhoke Habib
- Village of Union Council Mandrah
- Location within Pakistan
- Coordinates: 33°21′051.93″N 73°14′03.76″E
- Country: Pakistan
- Province: Punjab
- District: Rawalpindi
- Tehsil: Gujar Khan
- Union Council: Mandrah
- Village: Dhoke Habib

Government
  - Chairman: Raja Zulfikar Ali
  - Family Head: Raja Qamar Zaman
  - Welfare and politician: Raja Sohail Aziz guddu

Area
  - Total: 0.8 km^{2} (0.31 sq mi)
- Elevation: 510 m (1,670 ft)

Population (2021 (estimated))
  - Total: 331
- Time zone: UTC+5 (PST)
- Calling code: 0513

Dhoke Habib (Urdu: ڈھوک حبیب) is a village of Union Council Mandrah of Tehsil Gujar Khan, District Rawalpindi, Punjab, Pakistan. The village is well known for its dignity, family unity, discipline and nobleness. It is situated approximately 36 kilometers south of Rawalpindi.

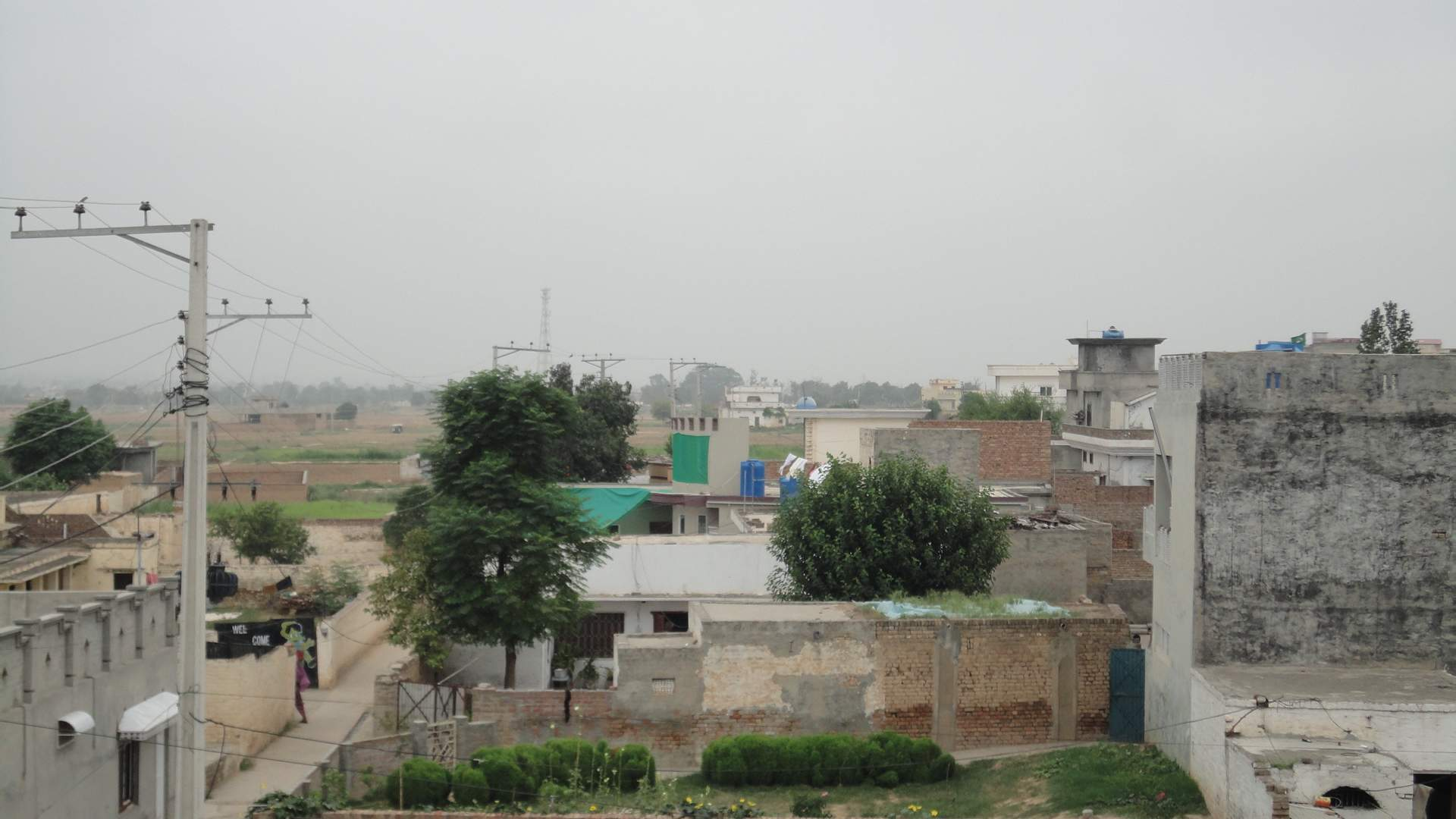
A view of Dhoke Habib

== Locality ==
Dhoke Habib is located 550 meters on west side of "Thandi Sadak" which is a link road originating 380 meters south of Mandrah town. This link road (Thandi Sadak) is just opposite to the PSO petrol pump on the Historic Grand Trunk Road which passes through the center of Mandrah town.

The precise geographical location of the village is at 33°21'51.93" North, 73° 14' 03.76" East.

== History ==
Historically the village's name was Jattan Na Mohra, also attributed as Parla Mohra, which was unregistered. However, during the 1960s the name was changed to Dhoke Habib and registered by local administration. The name is derived from "Dhoke" meaning "village", and "Habib", a notable headman of the family.

All the residents of the village are Muslim.

== Occupation ==
Considering the family tribe history, the residents' are mainly involved in land cultivation (Zameen Daari). Since the area is almost arid, cultivation is mostly rain depend. Major cultivation is wheat, grain, peanuts, corn and mustard.

Currently a major portion is in overseas jobs. Other occupations held are the military / government services, banking, educationalists, politics and a few in private business / jobs.

== Languages ==
The major language spoken is Punjabi language in Pothohari dialect, which is a major dialect of Pothohar Plateau. Other languages spoken are Urdu and English.

== Notable people ==
- Brigadier (Retd) Muhammad Yousaf (Late) - Sitara-i-Imtiaz (Military) - Civil Engineer, War Veteran (1965 & 1971)
