= Mohra Sarandaz =

Village in Tehsil Gujar Khan of the Rawalpindi District of Punjab, Pakistan

Mohra Sarandaz موہڑہ سرانداز روڈیاں نا موہڑہ
- Village
- Location in Punjab, Pakistan
- Coordinates: 33°13′34″N 73°09′30″E
- Country: Pakistan
- Province: Punjab
- District: Rawalpindi
- Tehsil: Gujar Khan
- Union Council: Sukho
- Post Code: 47721

Government
  - Nazim: Choudary Ibrar Sarwar
  - Naib Nazim: Haji Yaseen

Mohra Sarandaz (Urdu: موہڑہ سرانداز), colloquially known as Rodyan na Mohra (Punjabi: روڈیاں نا موہڑہ), is a village located near the Union Council Sukho, in the Gujar Khan Tehsil of Rawalpindi District, Punjab, Pakistan.

== Geography ==
It is situated approximately 3.5 km south-east of Bhangali Gujar and is connected to the town of Daultala via the Sukho–Daultala Road.

== See also ==
- Gujar Khan Tehsil
- Sukho
