= Jherain =

Village in Rawalpindi, Pakistan

Jherain is a village near the town of Mandrah in Tehsil Gujar Khan, District Rawalpindi, Pakistan.

The village is at 5 km from the GT (Grand Trunk) Road. Its population is approximately 30,000 inhabitants. Most of the people are connected to farming. Wheat, peanut, barley and vegetables are major crops. Others are employed in government jobs. The village lacks basic education and health facilities. There is no college, dispensary or bazar, although it has basic infrastructure of roads and streets.

Before the Partition of India, along with Muslims, Hindus and Sikhs also resided here. Today, the village's social life is shaped by Muslim and Pakistani culture. A notable personality, the late Ch. Lall Khan, of this village struggled for the welfare of people. They established a Govt High School (Bhatta) and cemented many streets with the aid of local government.

According to the 2017 census, the current population of Jherain Village is 25,000.

It is part of Union Council Kuri Dulal Tehsil Gujar Khan.

== See also ==
- List of Union Councils of Gujar Khan Tehsil
