= Changa Bangial =

- Union Council
- Changa Bangial
- Location in Pakistan
- Coordinates: 33°19′31″N 73°22′57.9″E
- Country: Pakistan
- Province: Punjab
- Region: Pothohar Plateau
- District: Rawalpindi
- Tehsil: Gujar Khan
- Language: Punjabi (Pothohari)
- Elevation: 1900 Feet (580 Meters)

Population
  - Estimate: 15,000
- Website: https://changabangial512.blogspot.com/

Changa Bangial (چنگا بنگیال) is a Union Council and an administrative subdivision of Gujar Khan Tehsil District Rawalpindi in the Pothohar Plateau region of Punjab Province of Pakistan. It comprises 56 small and large settlements (Dhoks), each with distinctive names, such as Dhok Achha Khan, Dhok Hayat Bakhsh, Jhandaran, Chhappar Shareef, Choora Sahreef, Noor Wasla, Mohra Darryaal, Daryala Saigan, Mohra Aheer, Mohra Kamaghar, Mohra Jaaghh, Shaheed Nagar, Bharol, Dhanda, Narali Jubair, Mall Awan, Mauza Hararr, Habib Chowk, Dhok Naseemiyan, Noor Ali Chowk, Sabbar, Dhok Baagh, Changa Maira, Bhaagsana and many more.

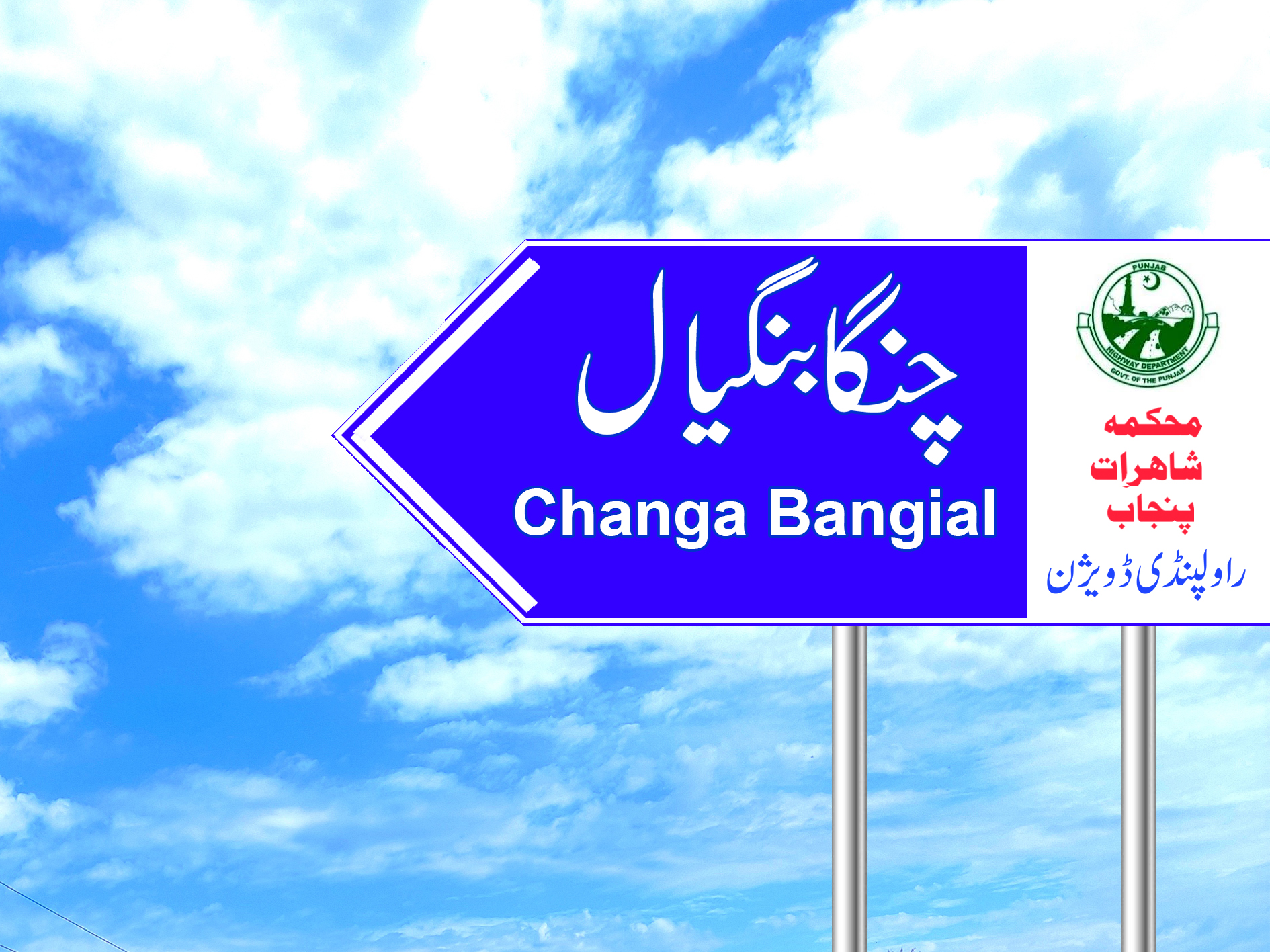
Changa Bangial Village Sign Board

== Location ==
Changa Bangial is located approximately seven miles from the tehsil capital, Gujar Khan, midway on the road to Tehsil Kallar Syedan. It is situated at 33°19'31.0"N 73°22'57.9"E. The area is geographically extensive, comprising multiple villages, including Mauza Darryaal, which consists of four smaller settlements: Mohra Peeru Wala, Dhok Chohan, Mohra Bajnial, and Mohra Daryal.

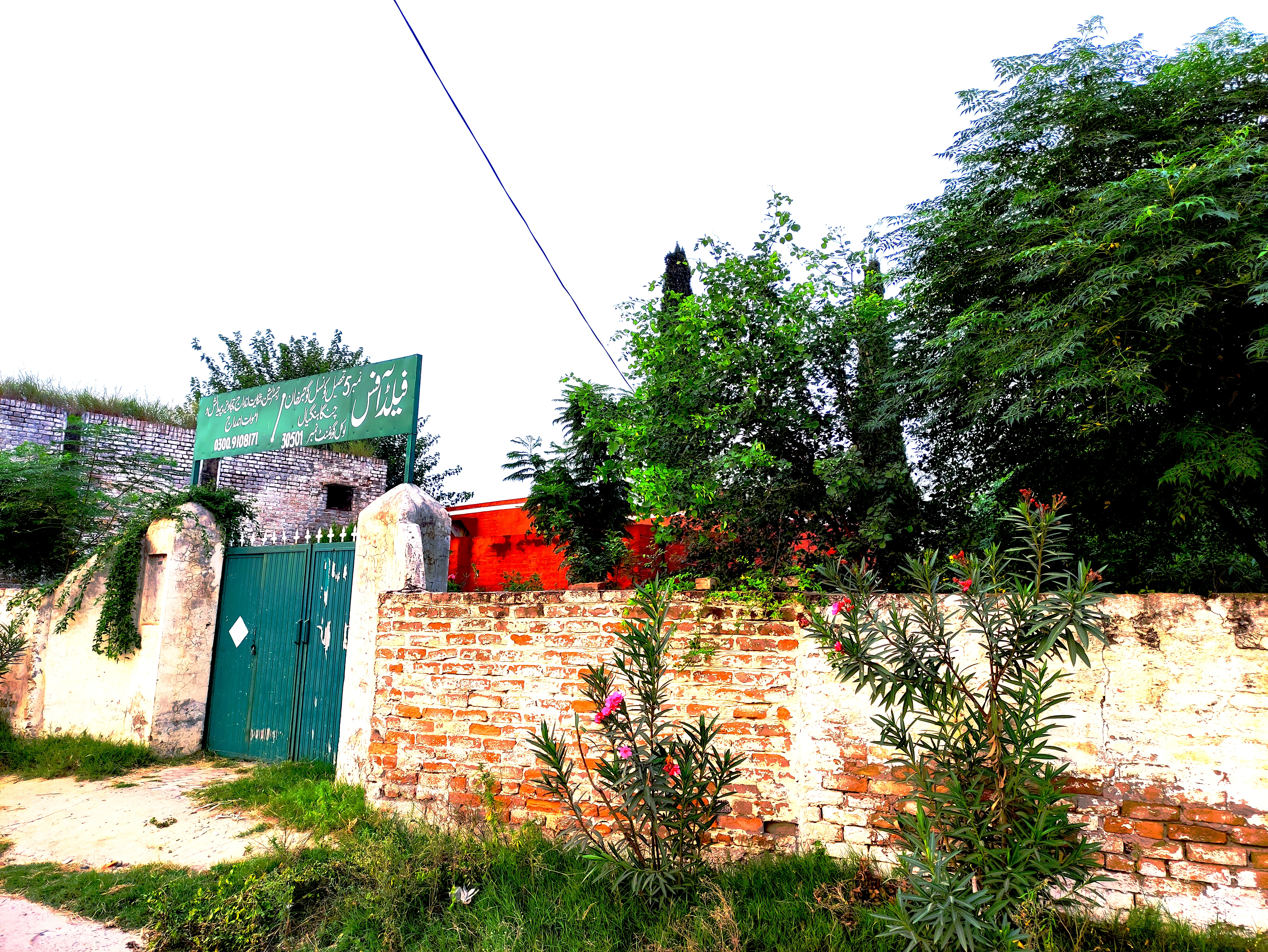
Union Council Changa Bangial

== Demographics and Tribes ==
The majority of the population belongs to the Bangial tribe which is a tribe of Parmar (clan), named after their ancestor Raja Bangash Khan, whose forefathers migrated from Dhara Nagri (now Dhar, India). The Bangial tribe has historically been associated with landownership in the region.

Other communities residing in Changa Bangial include Awan (tribe), Sayyid, Gujjar, Minhas Rajput, Janjua Rajput, Gakhars, Khokhar, Arain, Mirza, Miany, and Teli.

The population of Changa Bangial was estimated to be 15,000 according to the 1998 census.

A significant portion of the population has migrated to the United Kingdom, the Middle East, Canada, and other European countries for better economic opportunities. A large portion of population is serving in different Government services including Pakistan Armed Forces.

== Administration ==
The Union Council Office is located between two major settlements:

- Dhok Achha Khan (also known as Changa Bangial Stop No. 1)
- Dhok Hayat Bakhsh (also known as Changa Bangial Stop No. 2)

== Education ==
Changa Bangial has several educational institutions, including:

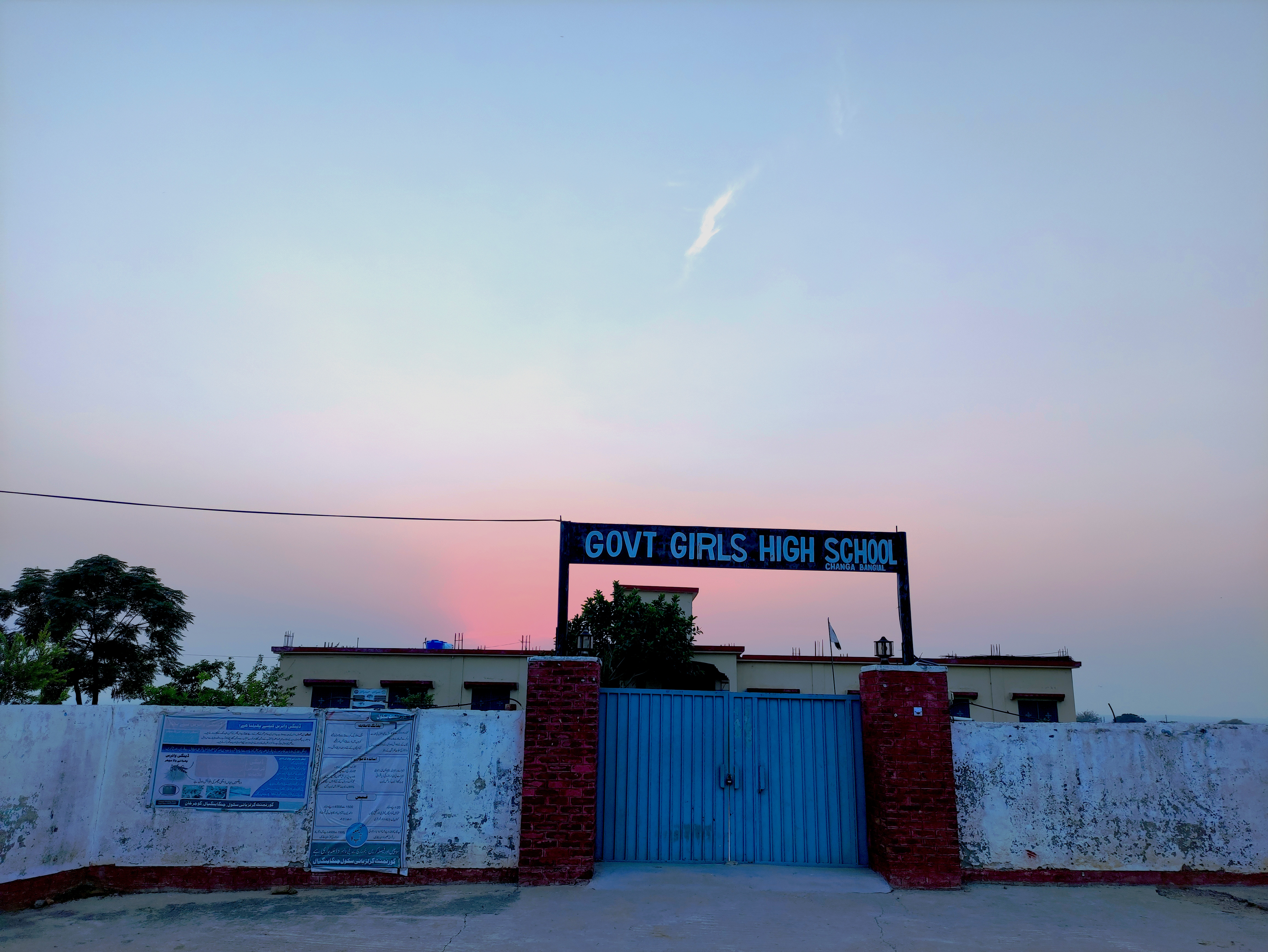
Government Girls High School Changa Bangial

- Government High Schools for Boys
  - GHS for Boys Changa Bangial
  - GHS for Boys Changa Maira
  - GHS for Boys Daryala Saigan
- Government Girls High Schools
  - GHS for Girls Changa Bangial
  - GHS for Girls Changa Maira
- Anwar-e-Madina Model College Narali Jabbair
- Shaheen Model School and College Changa Bangial
- Al-Suffah Model School, Habib Chowk
- Pothohar College, Habib Chowk
- Aizaz School System, Habib Chowk

== Infrastructure and Development ==
Habib Chowk

Habib Chowk is a central commercial hub connecting four major roads leading to Islampura Jabbar, Bewal, Kallar Syedan, and Gujar Khan. It has developed into a modern town with various amenities, including shopping centers, refreshment areas, and recreational facilities.

Ch Azam Theme Park Ch Azam Theme Park, located in Habib Chowk, is a significant recreational site featuring:

- Amusement rides
- A swimming pool
- Digital gaming facilities
- A snooker club
- A gymnasium
- A restaurant
- A marquee for events

Motorway Project

A new motorway project connecting Sialkot to Islamabad Capital Territory will include an interchange at Habib Chowk, which will be a linking of the motorway directly to Gujar Khan. This infrastructure development is expected to elevate Habib Chowk's status from a town to a fully developed city.

== People ==
- Muhammad Fazal Khan Changwi (1868–1938)
- Mohammad Amir - Pakistani International cricketer
