= Gulyana =

Coordinates: 33°12′N 73°16′E

Gulyana گلیانہ
- Town
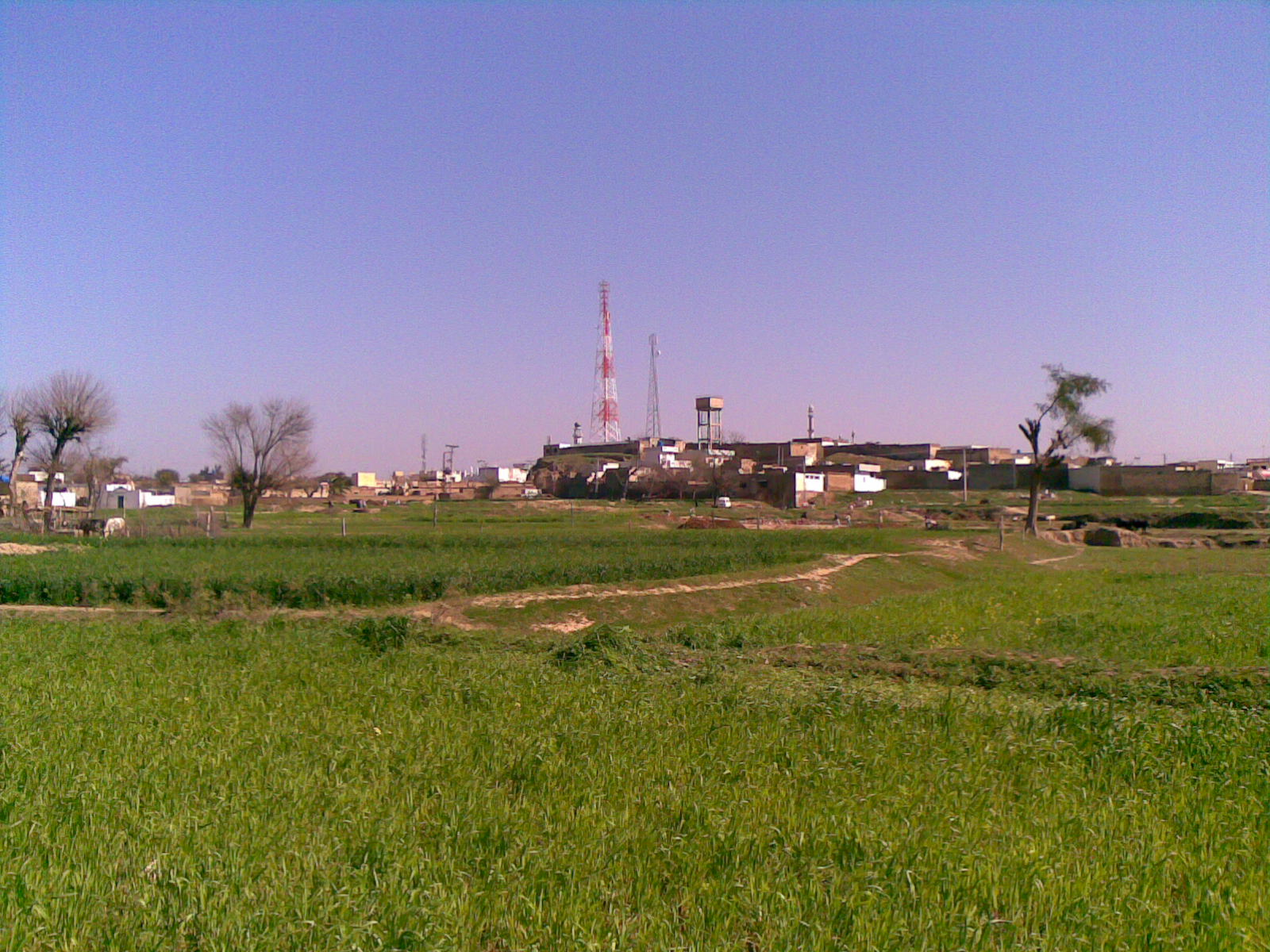
- Gulyana

- Location within Pakistan
- Country: Pakistan
- Province: Punjab
- District: Rawalpindi
- Tehsil: Gujar Khan

Population (1998)
  - Estimate: 25,000
- Time zone: UTC+5 (PST)

Gulyana (Urdu: گلیانہ) is a town in Gujar Khan Tehsil of Rawalpindi District, in the Punjab province of Pakistan. It also serves as the administrative centre of Union Council Gulyana, a local government subdivision of the tehsil.

The town is located approximately 62 km southeast of Islamabad (around 70 km by road) and about 215 km northwest of Lahore. Gulyana has an estimated population of about 25,000 residents.

Gulyana is situated near a seasonal stream locally known as the Gulyana River (Kass), which forms part of the drainage system of the Jhelum River basin. Agriculture is an important economic activity in the area, supported in part by irrigation from the Ogah Hoon Dam, which serves surrounding agricultural land.

The town has a relatively high literacy rate compared with many rural areas in the region, and many residents are employed in nearby urban centres such as Gujar Khan and Rawalpindi. Local economic activity also includes small-scale industry, including a private textile mill operating in the area.

== History ==
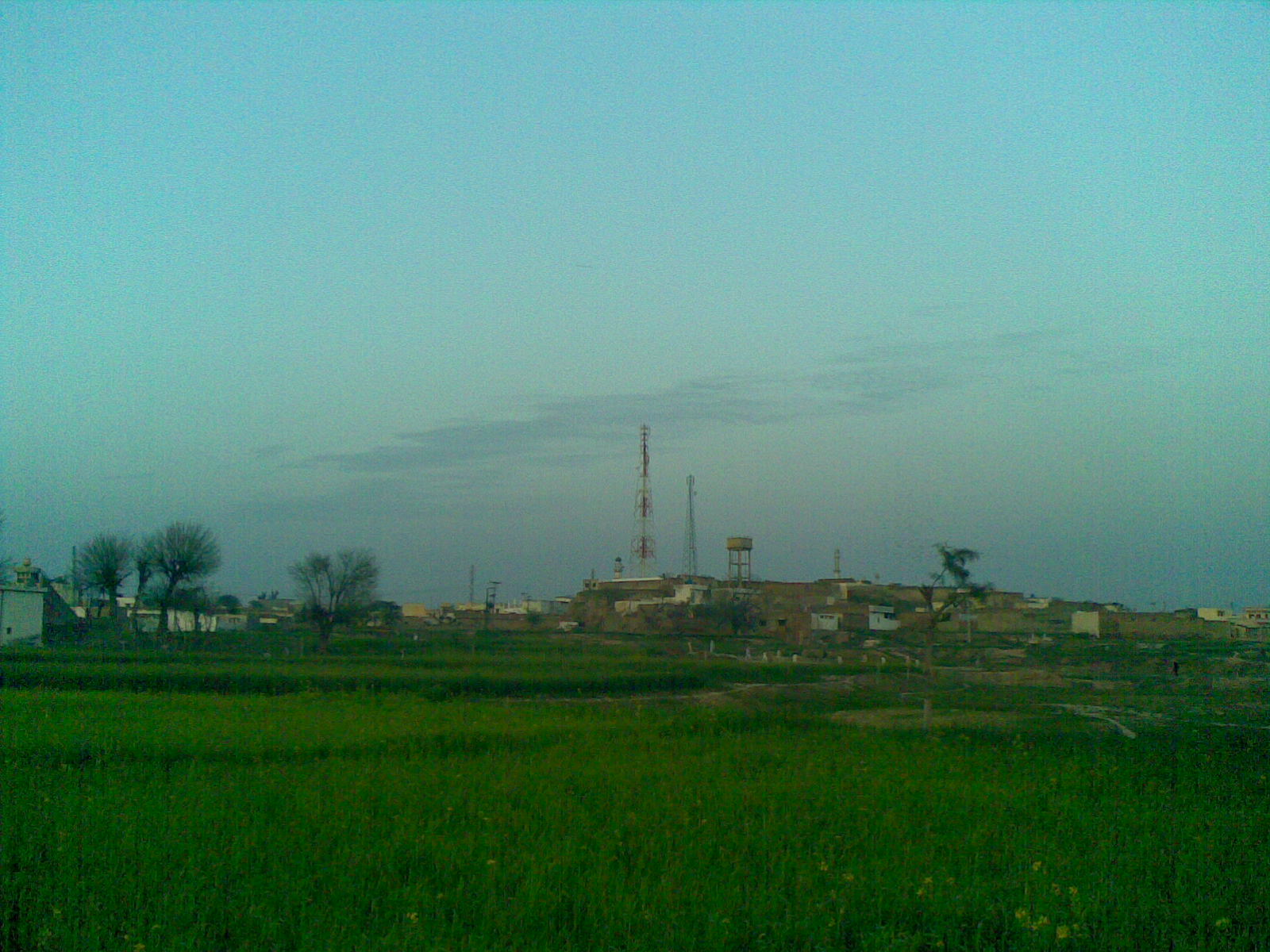
Gulyana: an evening view

Gulyana is believed to be approximately 900 years old. According to local tradition, the settlement was founded by a man named Gul Muhammad, from whom the town derives its name.

Historically, Gulyana served as a local trade centre for surrounding villages due to its location along a regional trade route. Prior to the Partition of India in 1947, the town was an administrative centre where a tehsildar office with limited judicial authority operated. Following the development and increased use of the Grand Trunk Road, administrative and judicial functions for the area were gradually concentrated in Gujar Khan.

A central elevated point in the settlement, locally known as "Pind" (now the site of a government girls' primary school), historically functioned as a gathering place for traders and residents. Merchants arriving in the town would announce the availability of goods there. During the 1960s and early 1970s, a traditional Punjabi drummer known locally as "Litto" (a Dhollu) accompanied the town crier, announcing the arrival of traders and new merchandise by beating a Dhol (ڈھول). The drum signals served as an audible notice to residents that goods had arrived in the area.

== Localities in Gulyana (محلے) ==
- Bagral (محلہ بگرال)
- Budwal (محلہ بدھوال)
- Hayal (محلہ حیال)
- Jatal (محلہ جٹال)
- Lodhra (محلہ لودھراں)
- Kashmerian (محلہ کشمیریاں)
- Raghan (محلہ راجگان)
- Garhi (محلہ گڑھی)
- Iqbal colony (اقبال کالونی)
- Dhoke Sayen Godhar (ڈھوک سائیں گودڑ)
- Dhoke Shairian (ڈھوک شیریاں)
- Dhoke Khinger (ڈھوک کھینگر)
- New Muradial (نیا مرادیال)
- Mill (مل)

== Nearby Towns (قریبی گاؤں) ==
- Chakri Wakeelan (چکری وکیلاں)
- Khali Khinger (کاہلی کھینگر)
- Bains (بینس)
- Dhoke Mughalan (ڈھوک مغلاں)
- Dhoke Mirpurian (ڈھوک میرپوریاں)
- Dhoke Juma Khan (ڈھوک جمعہ خان)
- Bawlyal (باولیال)
- Muradial (مرادیال)
- Ratial (رتیال)
- Dulmi (دلمى)

== Occupations ==
80% of the population depends on agriculture. Lands of that area are very fertile. Main Crops are: wheat, millet, peanuts and other pulses.

=== Major industries ===
- Chicken and fish farming
- Vegetable and fruits farming
- Milk production animals farming
- Pottery

== Hospital ==
Gulyana has one main Government dispensary. Private hospitals and healthcare units are also working in the town. Health workers are also working in basic health unit in the area.

== Gulyana River ==
The Gulyana River, locally known as Kass (کس), is a seasonal stream in Gujar Khan, Punjab, Pakistan that flows generally from west to east through the Gulyana area. It is part of the drainage system of the Jhelum River. The river is typical of arid and semi-arid regions of the Pothohar Plateau, where water flow depends largely on rainfall and increases significantly during the monsoon season.

The river originates near the village of Muradi Janjeel (مرادی جنجیل) and flows through nearby settlements including Sukho (سکھو). Several smaller seasonal streams originating near the Mandra–Chakwal Road contribute to its discharge. Upstream of Gulyana, the river feeds Ogha Hun Dam, a small local reservoir.

Near Gulyana, the river follows a strongly meandering sinuous course that forms a W-shaped pattern around the settlement, shaping the surrounding landscape. The river then continues eastward and crosses the Grand Trunk Road through Metro City Bhai Khan. Downstream, it joins Kanshi River (کانسی) and a third river Kas Bishan Daur another mangla lake tributary that drains Kauntrila (کونتریلہ) to Daryala Khaki parts of Gujar Khan Tehsil. The combined drainage of three rivers ultimately enters the Mangla Dam reservoir on the main Jhelum River.

=== Ogha Hun Dam ===
Ogha Hun Dam is a small dam constructed on the Gulyana River (locally known as Kass)(کس), located approximately 4 km from the town of Gulyana (about 5 km by road). The dam provides water for the irrigation of seasonal crops in the surrounding agricultural lands through a network of small canals.

== Telecommunication ==
The PTCL provides the main network of landline telephone. Many ISPs and all major mobile phone, Wireless companies operating in Pakistan provide service in Gulyana.

== Education ==
- Government high school (boys)
- Government high school (girls)
- Government primary school (boys)
- Government primary school (girls)

== See also ==
- Gujar Khan Tehsil
- List of people from Gujar Khan
