= GNX =

GNX may refer to:

- Buick Regal GNX, a variant of the Buick Regal made in 1987
- GNX (album), by Kendrick Lamar, 2024
  - "GNX" (song), by Kendrick Lamar, 2024
- Genex Power, the ASC code GNX
- Ghungrila railway station, the station code GNX
- Ganaxolone, a medication used to treat seizures
