= Bokra Sharif =

Pakistani village

Coordinates: 33°09′03″N 73°14′20″E

Bokra, Pakistan Bokra Sharif
- Village/town
- Bokra
- Interactive map of Bokra, Pakistan
- Country: Pakistan
- Province: Punjab
- Joined Pakistan: 1947

Population (2014)
  - Total: 6,500 appx.
- Time zone: UTC+5 (PKT)
  - Summer (DST): UTC+5 (PKT)
- Area code: +92-351

Bokra Sharif is a village located in Gujar Khan, Punjab, with geographical coordinates 33.148489 N, 73.238060 E. Its original name (with diacritics) is Bokra.

== Location ==
Bokra is a village located in Punjab, in the vicinity of Sasral, Chechi Bahadur, Chak Rajgan. It is situated in Rawalpindi District, within Gujar Khan Tehsil.

== Population ==
The approximate population is 6,500 as of 2014, based on around 1,000 houses with an average of 5 to 7 people per family.

== Language ==
The primary language spoken by villagers is Potohari. Urdu is also spoken.

== Culture ==
Villagers celebrate various events, including Eid, weddings, and fairs. Jashen Eid e Milaad. Fairs are held in nearby villages such as Mian Mohra and Khanyal, featuring stalls, horse riding, and kabaddi. A unique ritual celebrating the completion of bamboo mats was once practiced but is no longer observed.

== Shrine ==
Ziārat Bawa Shaheed Badshah

== Hill ==
One Tree Hill (5.3 km) and Mira Dhok (5.6 km)

== Source of income ==
Many residents serve in the Armed forces as officers and soldiers. The village has produced notable politicians and officers, including SUB(R) Farman Ali Raja Ex General Councilor, Raja Liaqat Ali late Ex Vice Chairman,Ex Naib Nazam Ch Saleem, Ch Razzaq Ex General Councilor, Raja Shafiq, Dr Azhar, secretary Asif etc. Other residents operate small shops, agriculture, medical rep, cattle farming or work as mechanics and carpenters. The village also known as business Hub currently has three main markets/commercial areas like 03 hotels, 05 barber shops, 01 service station, 06 stitched or unstitched clothes shops, electric and saintery shops and more then 40 Grocery / Karyaana stores. Bokra also has a cemetery, three mosques including Masjid Abu hanifa, Jamia Naqshbandia and 3rd near Qabristan and a hospital located at tha stop called Azahar Hospital.

== Health ==
Bokra has basic health facilities, including a private hospital (Azhar Hospital) and a government hospital. Azhar Hospital provides services such as X-Ray, ECG, Ultrasound, and laboratory facilities, and also includes a pharmacy.
