= Phambray Rajgan =

- Village
- Country: Pakistan
- Province: Punjab (Pakistan)
- District: Rawalpindi
- Time zone: UTC+5 (PST)

Phambray Rajgan is a village in the Rawalpindi district near the city of Gujar Khan. Its population is nearly 1000.
