= Bher Ahir =

Coordinates: 33°13′N 73°04′E

- Village
- Location within Pakistan
- Country: Pakistan
- Province: Punjab (Pakistan)
- District: Rawalpindi
- Time zone: UTC+5 (PST)

Ahir is a village situated in the Gujar Khan Tehsil of Rawalpindi District, of Punjab, Pakistan. Its geographical coordinates are 33° 13' 0 North and 73° 4' 0 East.
