= Tirnale Bangial =

- Location within Pakistan
- Coordinates: 33.28°N 73.16°E
- Country: Pakistan
- Province: (Islamabad Capital Territory) Islamabad C.T
- Elevation: 554 m (1,818 ft)

Population
  - Total: 42,231
- Time zone: UTC+5 (PST)

Tirnale Bangial is a town in the Islamabad Capital Territory of Pakistan. It is located at 33° 28' 45N 73° 16' 10E with an altitude of 554 metres (1820 feet).

The town gets its name from the Bangial tribe, who make up the bulk of the population.
