= Bahgwal Dargahi =

- Village
- Location within Pakistan
- Country: Pakistan
- Province: Punjab (Pakistan)
- District: Rawalpindi
- Time zone: UTC+5 (PST)

Bahgwal Dargahi is a village in Kalyam Awan with a population of about 600 people. The village mainly depends on agriculture.
