= Usman Zada Adra =

- Village
- Country: Pakistan
- Province: Punjab (Pakistan)
- District: Rawalpindi
- Time zone: UTC+5 (PST)

Usman Zada Adra is a village in Tehsil Gujar Khan, District Rawalpindi, Pakistan.

== See also ==
- Tribes and clans of the Pothohar Plateau
