= Galyana =

Galyanna may refer to:

-Gulyana, a town in Punjab, Pakistan

-The capitol of the 2002 shooter game Turok: Evolution
