= Punjgran Kalan =

Coordinates: 33°09′N 73°02′E

- Union council
- Interactive map of Punjgran Kalan
- Country: Pakistan
- Province: Punjab
- District: Rawalpindi
- Tehsil: Gujar Khan

Punjgran Kalan (Urdu: پنجگراں كلاں) is a town in Gujar Khan Tehsil Punjab, Pakistan. Punjgaran is also chief town of Union Council Punjgaran which is an administrative subdivision of the Tehsil,; and according to the 1998 census of Pakistan, the population of the Union Councils was 17',419.Total Number of Population is more than 3000.The famous personality of punjgran kalan Chairman Raja Aamir Afsar(Late) 1942-2019 & Barkat Hussain Malik (late) 1925 - 2022.May there souls rest in heaven.

Subedar Hassu Khan (Late) was a notable military personality from British India. He served in the Royal Indian Army and was a graduate of the Indian Military Academy (IMA), Dehradun.During his military career, he purchased 500 kanal of land in Punjgran Kalan. In 1905, he was awarded the Sword of Honour by Viceroy Lord Curzon after winning the All-India Tent Pegging Competition in New Delhi. Subedar Hassu Khan actively served in World War I and World War II, including the Burma Campaign. He retired from service in 1946. He died in 1967 and was buried in the Punjgran Kalan graveyard.
