= Fazal Khan Changawi =

British Indian writer

Maulawi Muhammad Fazal Khan Changawi (1868–1938) was a writer in British India, who wrote numerous books on Islam, and was the translator of Futuhat Makkiya by Ibn Arabi and some of his other works. His best known original contribution to Islamic literature is Asrar-i Shariat (The secrets of the Muslim creed).

== Biography ==
Changawi was a native of Changa Bangial in Rawalpindi district (now Pakistan). By the age of 17 Changawi was educated in religious studies and had a good command of Arabic, Persian and Urdu. In 1885, he was admitted to the Mission School in Rawalpindi and studied there for three years, acquiring working knowledge of English, in which he later published numerous works.

Changawi compiled the Ahmadiyya Fiqh during the life-time of Mirza Ghulam Ahmad, whose pronouncements (Fatwas) pertaining to the rituals and later those of his successors were compiled in Fatawa Ahmadiyya in two volumes. This compendium was later expanded into a multi-volume book on the same subject. Changawi also pursued his studies of Sufi literature, the culmination of which was his translation of the Futuhat Makkiya by Ibn Arabi. Eventually only two volumes were published. In 1999 a new edition of this work was released in one volume in Lahore. The second part of this translation came out in 2013. Changawi said that he had compiled and translated another book about the experiences of Ibn Arabi, to be published under the title of Mushahadat-i Ibn Arabi, but this book was not printed. The second volume of the Fatwa Ahmadiyya was translated and published in 2017.
