= Jand Mehlo =

- Union council
- Country: Pakistan
- Province: Punjab
- District: Rawalpindi
- Tehsil: Gujar Khan

Jand Mahlo (Urdu: جنڈمہلو) is a town in Gujar Khan Tehsil Punjab, Pakistan. Jand Mehlo is also chief town of Union Council Jand Mehlo which is an administrative subdivision of the Tehsil. Union council Jand Mehlo comprises many other towns such as Jubokassi Rajgan, Jubokassi Badhal, Jubokassi Malik, Rummat, Bhalot, Aheer, Repa, and Mall.
