= Devi, Punjab =

Devi
- Union council
- Interactive map of Devi
- Country: Pakistan
- Province: Punjab
- District: Rawalpindi
- Tehsil: Gujar Khan

Devi (Urdu: ديوى) is a town and union council, an administrative subdivision, of Gujar Khan Tehsil in the Punjab province of Pakistan.
