= Jhungle =

Jhungal (Jhungle)
- Town and union council
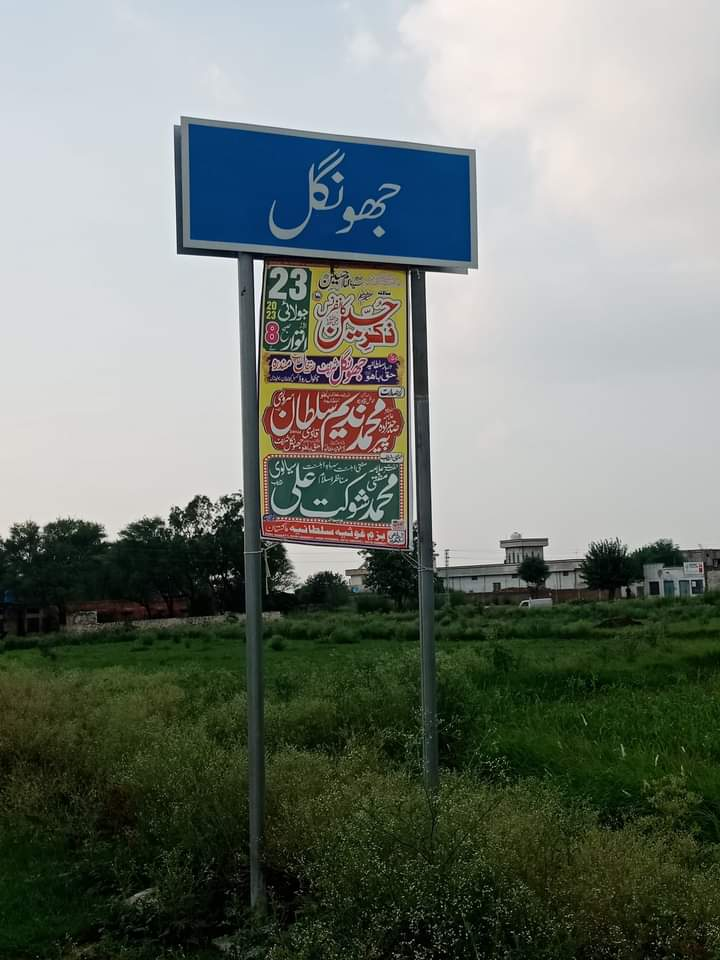
- Country: Pakistan
- Region: Rawalpindi
- District: Rawalpindi District
- Time zone: UTC+5 (PST)

Jhungle (Jhungal) (Urdu: جهونگل) is a small town in Gujar Khan Tehsil, Punjab, Pakistan. It is also the chief town of Union Council Jhungle which is an administrative subdivision of the Tehsil.
