= Mohra Noori =

- Union council
- Country: Pakistan
- Province: Punjab
- District: Rawalpindi
- Tehsil: Gujar Khan

Mohra Noori (Urdu: موهڑه نورى) is a town in the Rawalpindi District of Punjab province, Pakistan.

== Administration ==
Mohra Nooris is also the principal town of Mohra Noori Union council which is one of the 33 Union Councils (i.e. subdivisions) of Gujar Khan Tehsil.
