= Karumb Ilyas =

Karunb Ilyas
- Union council
- Tehsil: Gujar Khan
- Province Punjab: Punjab
- District Rawalpindi: Rawalpindi
- Government: Chairman Yahya Faiz

Government

Population (2013)
  - Total: 27 - 30 thousand

Karumb Ilyas (Urdu: كرنب الياس) is a town in Gujar Khan Tehsil, Punjab, Pakistan. Karumb Ilyas is also chief town of Union Council Karumb Ilyas which is an administrative subdivision of the Tehsil. Current Chairman of Union Council Karumb Ilyas is Chairman Yahya Faiz.
