= Dhoke Pashoriyan =

ڈھوک پشوریاں
- village
- ڈھوک پشوریاں
- Interactive map of ڈھوک پشوریاں
- Coordinates: 33°19′14″N 73°09′26″E

Area
  - Total: 0.02 km^{2} (0.0077 sq mi)

Dhoke Pashoriyan is the sub village of Paimal, Rawalpindi district, Pakistan The people of dhoke Pashoriyan came from Peshawar or other place in Paimal now these have 900 kanals in Paimal
