= Matwa =

- Union council
- Country: Pakistan
- Province: Punjab
- District: Rawalpindi
- Tehsil: Gujar Khan

Government
  - Nazim: Chaudhary Niamat

Matwa (Urdu: مطوعه) is a town in Gujar Khan Tehsil, Punjab, Pakistan. Matwa is also the chief town of union council Matwa, which is an administrative subdivision of the Tehsil.
