= Raman, Rawalpindi =

Raman
- Union council
- Country: Pakistan
- Province: Punjab
- District: Rawalpindi
- Tehsil: Gujar Khan

Population
  - Total: 2,500

Raman (Urdu: راماں) is a town in Gujar Khan Tehsil Punjab, Pakistan. Raman is also the chief town of Union Council Raman which is an administrative subdivision of the Tehsil.
