= Chaudhary Javed Kausar =

Pakistani politician

Member of the Provincial Assembly of the Punjab
- Incumbent
- Assumed office 23 February 2024
- Constituency: PP-8 Rawalpindi-II
- In office 15 August 2018 – 14 January 2023
- Constituency: PP-8 Rawalpindi-III

Personal details
- Born: 20 April 1950 (age 76) Bewal, West Punjab, Pakistan
- Party: PTI (2018-present)

Chaudhary Javed Kausar is a Pakistani politician who had been a member of the Provincial Assembly of the Punjab from August 2018 till January 2023.

== Political career ==
He was elected to the Provincial Assembly of the Punjab as a candidate of the Pakistan Tehreek-e-Insaf (PTI) from PP-8 Rawalpindi-III in the 2018 Punjab provincial election. He received 48,221 votes and defeated Khurram Pervez Raja, a candidate of Pakistan People's Party (PPP).

He ran for a seat in the Punjab Provincial Assembly from PP-8 Rawalpindi-II as an Independent candidate backed by the PTI in the 2024 Punjab provincial election and was able to win his seat.
