= Thathi =

Union council in Punjab, Pakistan

Thathi (Urdu: تهاتهى) is a town in Gujar Khan Tehsil, Punjab, Pakistan.

Thathi is a Union c the most the wealthy in Gujarkhan. Many of its residents settled in the United Kingdom.

According to the 1998 Census of Pakistan, it had a population of 14,563 (estimated over 30,000 in 2011).
