= Qazian =

Historical Village in Tehsil GujarKhan, Rawalpindi District, Pakistan

- Union council
- Location within Punjab, Pakistan Location within Pakistan
- Coordinates: 33°17′58″N 73°23′46″E
- Country: Pakistan
- Province: Punjab
- District: Rawalpindi
- Tehsil: Gujar Khan

Qazian (Urdu: قاضياں) is a town in Gujar Khan Tehsil, Pakistan. Qazian is also the chief town of the Union Council Qazian, which is an administrative subdivision of the Tehsil. It is located close to Bewal near Gujar Khan which is in the Rawalpindi District.
