= Mankiala Brahmanan =

Mankiala Muslim
- Union council
- Country: Pakistan
- Province: Punjab
- District: Rawalpindi
- Tehsil: Gujar Khan

Mankiala (Urdu: مانكياله), commonly known as Mankiala Muslim or Mankiala Brahman, is a town in Gujar Khan Tehsil, Punjab, Pakistan. Mankiala is also the chief town of Union Council Mankiala, which is an administrative subdivision of the tehsil.
