= Kaniat Khalil =

- Union council
- Country: Pakistan
- Province: Punjab
- District: Rawalpindi
- Tehsil: Gujar Khan

Government
  - Lambardar: Mirza Imran Aurangzeb Kayani
  - Lambardar: Mirza Imran Aurangzeb Kayani

Kaniat Khalil (Urdu: کنيٹ خليل) is a town in Gujar Khan Tehsil, Rawalpindi, Punjab, Pakistan. Kaniat Khalil is also chief town of Union Council Kaniat Khalil which is an administrative subdivision of the Tehsil.

Government of Pakistan Mirza Imran Aurangzeb Kayani is the current Lambardar passed down to him from his father Mirza Aurangzeb Khan who had it passed down from his father Mirza Mohammed Kayani. It operates a High School in Kaniat Khalil. In 2015 there were 223 students and 10 teachers, and 9 classrooms.
