= Jarmot Kalan =

Coordinates: 33°08′N 73°19′E

- Union council
- Interactive map of Jarmot Kalan
- Country: Pakistan
- Province: Punjab
- District: Rawalpindi
- Tehsil: Gujar Khan

Jarmot Kalan (Urdu: جرموٹ كلاں) is a town, Union council and administrative subdivision of Gujar Khan Tehsil in the Punjab Province of Pakistan.
