= Kaliam Awan =

Kaliam Awan كَليَام اَعوَان (Urdu) Kaliam Sharif
- Union Council
- Interactive map of Kaliam Awan
- Coordinates: 33°25′0″N 73°13′0″E
- Province: Punjab
- Division: Rawalpindi
- District: Rawalpindi District
- Tehsil: Gujar Khan Tehsil
- Religion: Islam
- Elevation: 536 m (1,759 ft)
- Demonym: Kalyami (كليامي)
- Time zone: UTC+5 (PST)

Kaliam Awan, also spelt Kalyam Awan (Urdu: كَليَام اَعوَان, romanized: Kalyām Awān), alternatively known as Kaliam Sharif, also spelt Kalyam Sharif (Urdu: كَليَام شَرِيف, romanized: Kalyām Sharīf), is a village that's situated atop the Pothohar Plateau in the north of Punjab, specifically in Gujar Khan, Rawalpindi.

Kaliam Awan is known primarily due to its historical association with Sufism, for the shrine of a Hashemite Sufi known as Faḍal al-Dīn al-Kalyāmī is present therein, who was associated with the Chishti Sufi order (tariqa). As per the latter portion of the name of the village, Kalyam holds a community largely associated with the Awan tribe, an Alid tribe that traces its lineage back to the fourth Caliph of the Muslims, Ali ibn Abi Talib.

== Fazal ud-Din's Shrine ==
The shrine of the Hashemite Chishti Sufi, Fazal ud-Din, is present within the village. People visit the shrine, and partake in 'acts of worship', otherwise deemed acts of heresy by the traditional and mainstream scholars of Islam, including not just residents of Kalyam themselves but people from surrounding areas too. Fazal ud-Din's shrine is present here, and the Urs is held from late December till early January, every year. The shrine is visited particularly for the Urs of Fazal ud-Din, and in Sufism, an Urs is the celebration of the death anniversaries of major Sufi characters. Activities at the shrine typically include prayer, recitation, and communal events linked to local religious practices.

== Location and Geography ==
In itself, Kalyam Awan is a village located in the Rawalpindi District of Punjab, Pakistan. More specifically, it lies within the Pothohar Plateau and is primarily an agricultural area. The terrain is slightly hilly, and the region experiences a semi-arid climate. The locals speak the Pothwari dialect.

Distances from Kalyam Awan
Location	Distance (approx.)
Chak Beli Khan	55 km
Rawalpindi	30 km
Islamabad	44 km
Chakwal	72 km
Gujar Khan	24 km

== See also ==
- Awans of Pakistan
