= Gujar Khan railway station =

Railway station in Pakistan

Gujar Khan Railway Station گوجرخان ریلوے اسٹیشن

General information
- Location: Railway Road, Gujar Khan
- Coordinates: 33.2587°N 73.3079°E
- Owner: Ministry of Railways
- Line: Karachi–Peshawar Railway Line
- Platforms: 2
- Tracks: 3

Construction
- Structure type: Standard (on ground station)
- Platform levels: 1
- Parking: Available
- Accessible: Available

Other information
- Status: Functional
- Station code: GKN
- Fare zone: Pakistan Railways Rawalpindi Zone

History
- Opened: 1916; 110 years ago

Services
Preceding station	Pakistan Railways	Following station
Missa Keswal towards Kiamari	Karachi–Peshawar Line	Ghungrila towards Peshawar Cantonment
Location

Gujar Khan Railway Station (Urdu and Punjabi: گوجرخان ریلوے اسٹیشن) is located in middle of the Gujar Khan city, Rawalpindi District of Punjab, Pakistan. The station is staffed and has a booking office.

== Train routes ==
The routes are Gujar Khan from linked to Karachi, Lahore, Quetta, Peshawar, Rawalpindi, Nowshera, Hyderabad, Sukkur, Attock, Bahawalpur, Nowshera, Rahim Yar Khan, Sargodha, Kotri, Jhelum, and Gujrat.

== Gallery ==
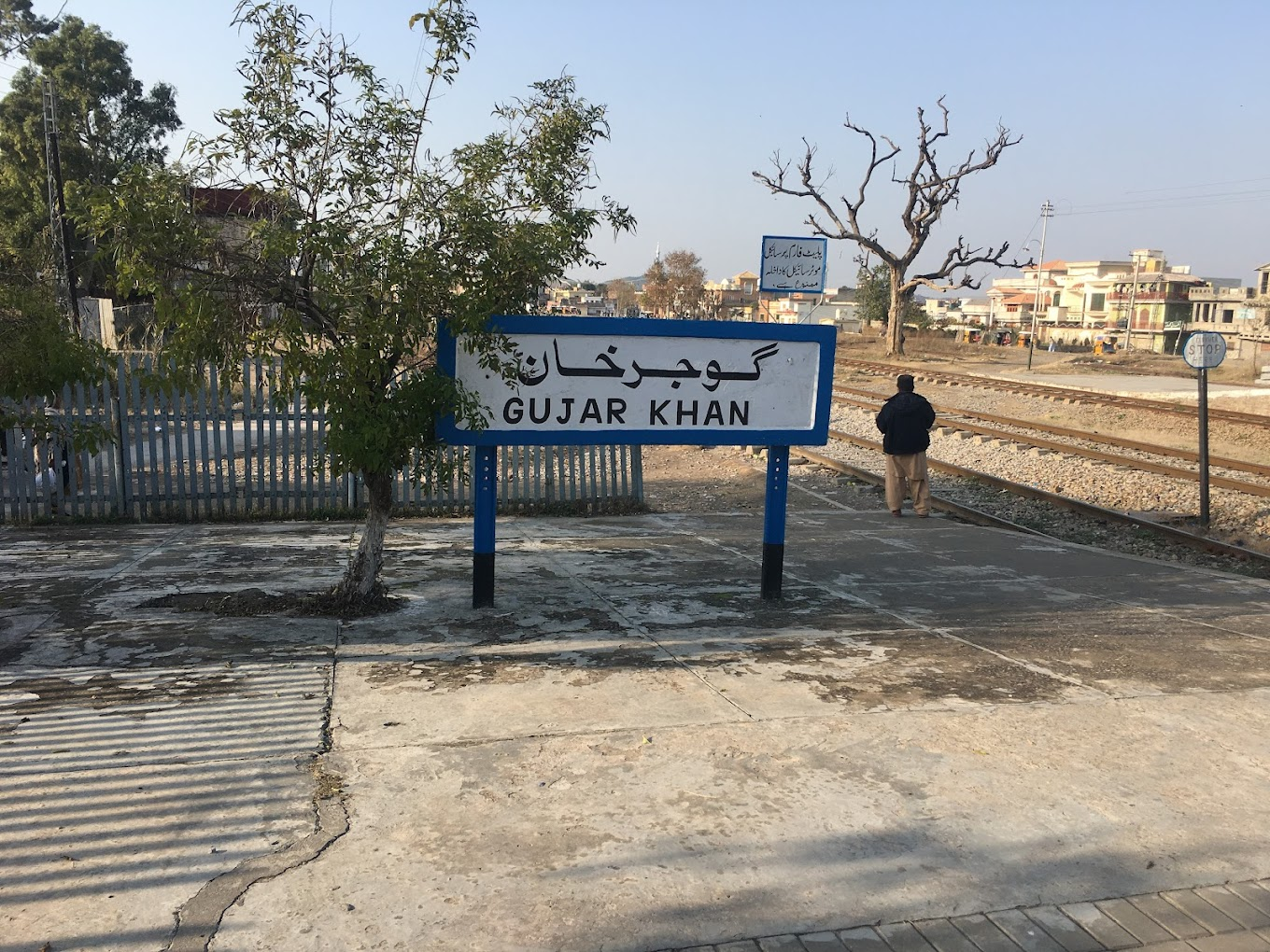

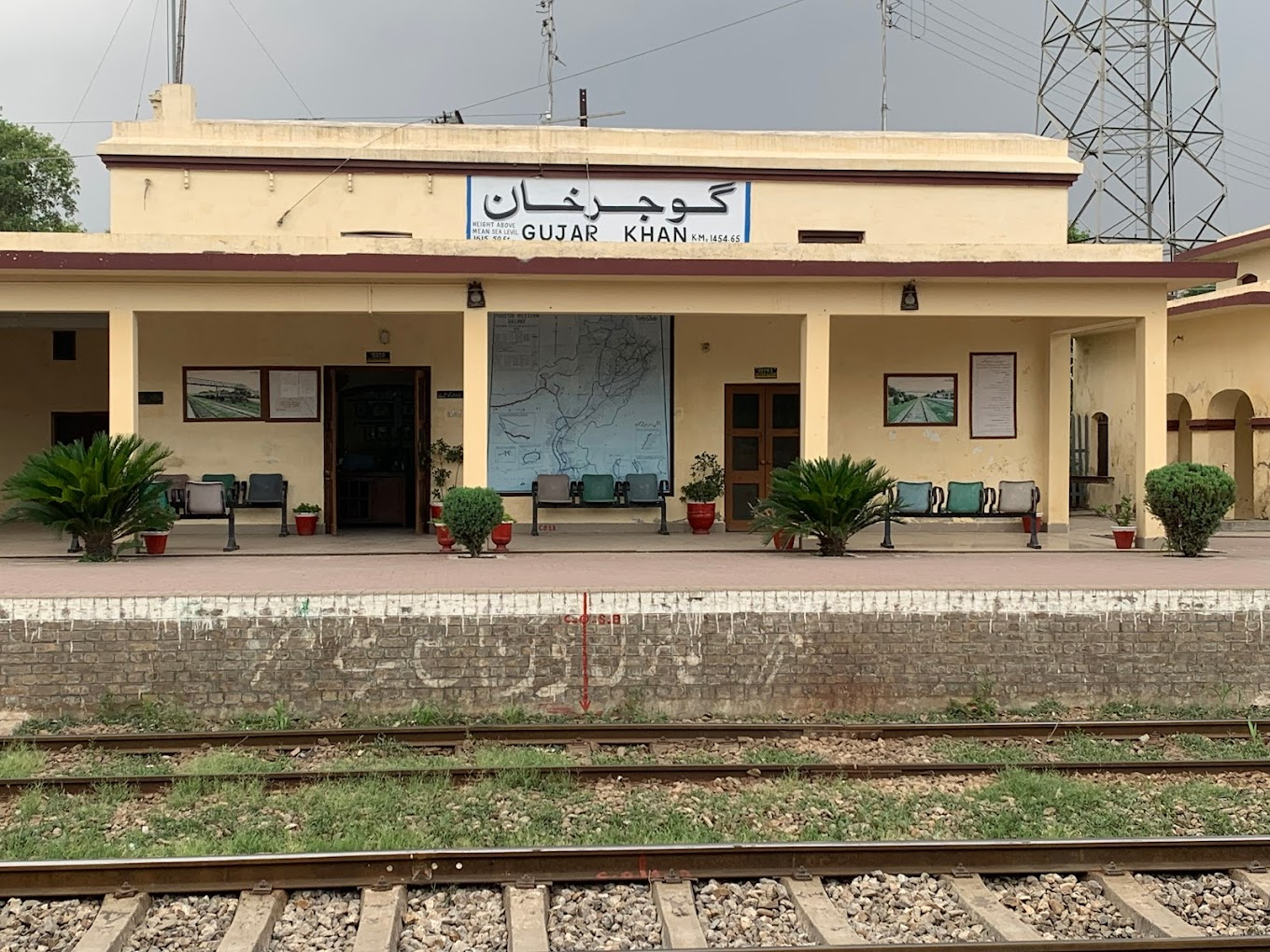

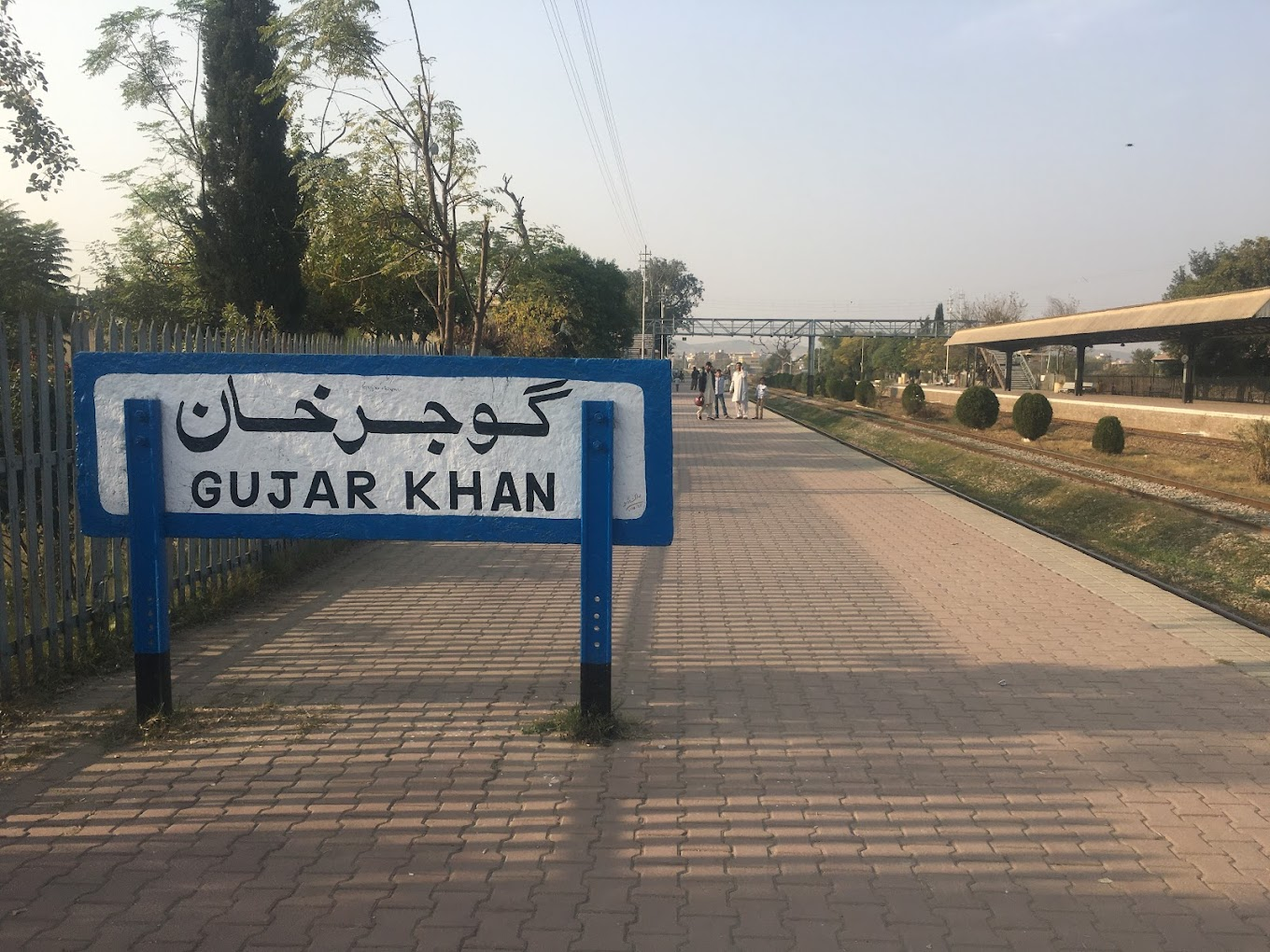

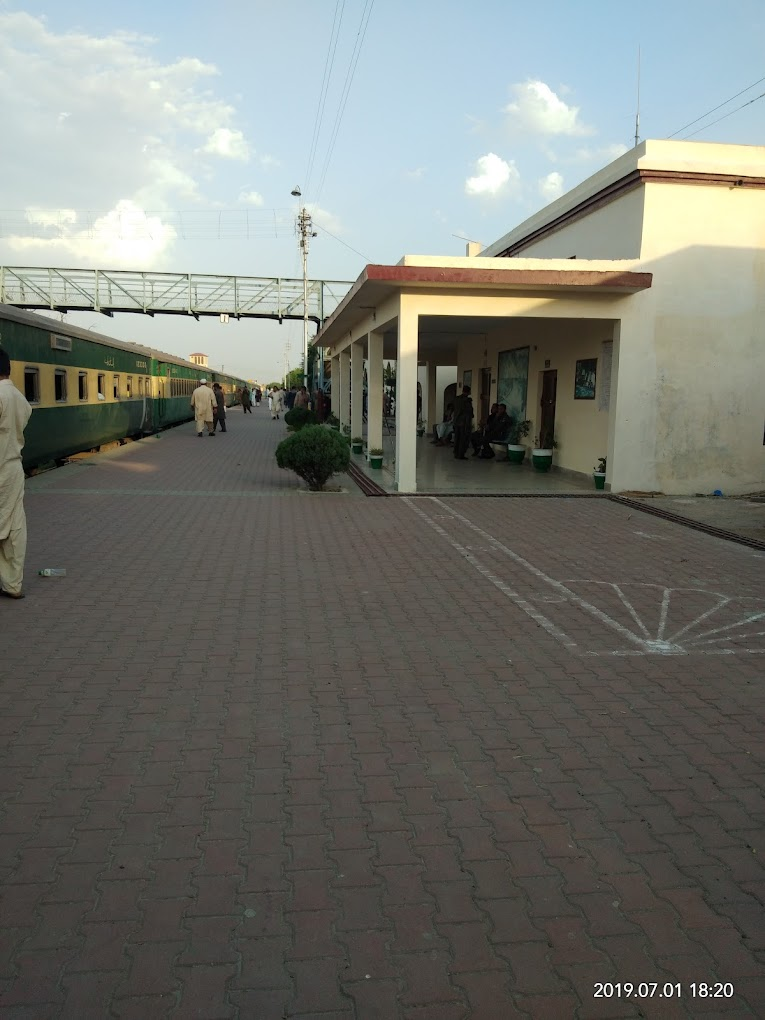

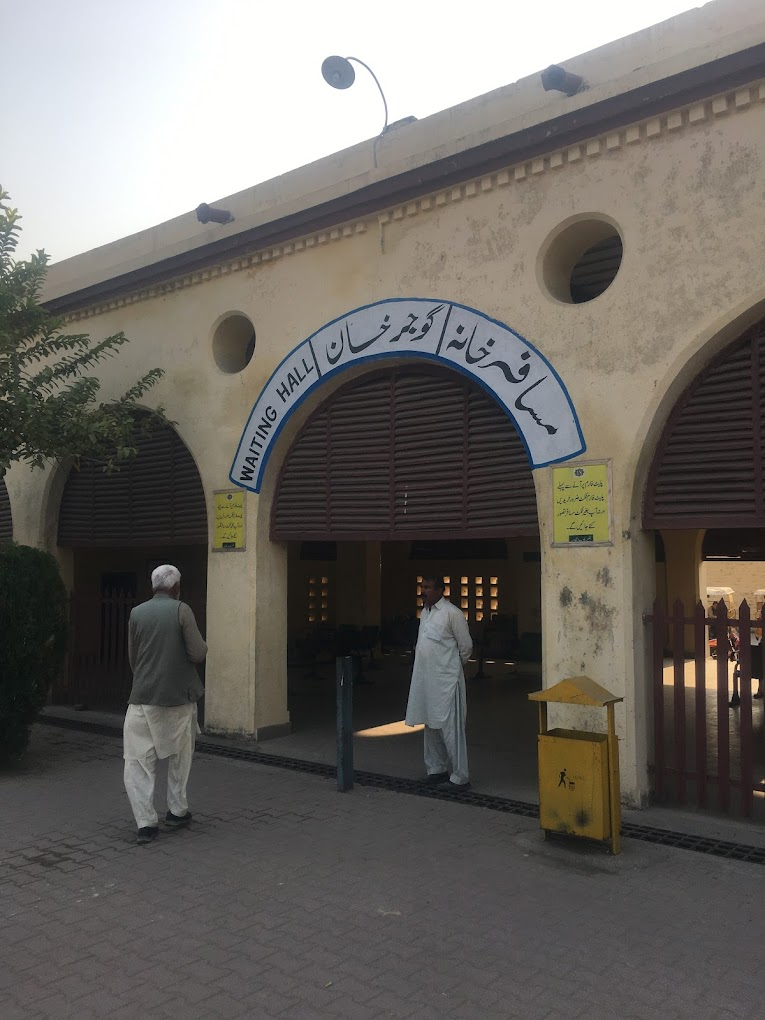

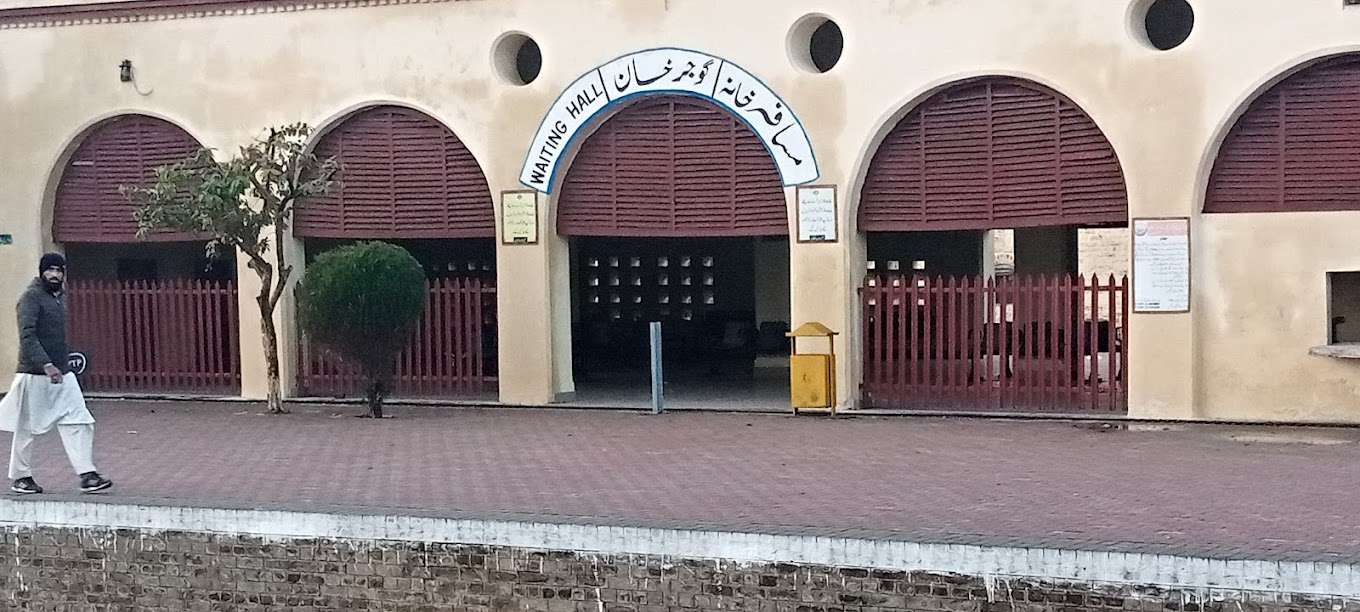

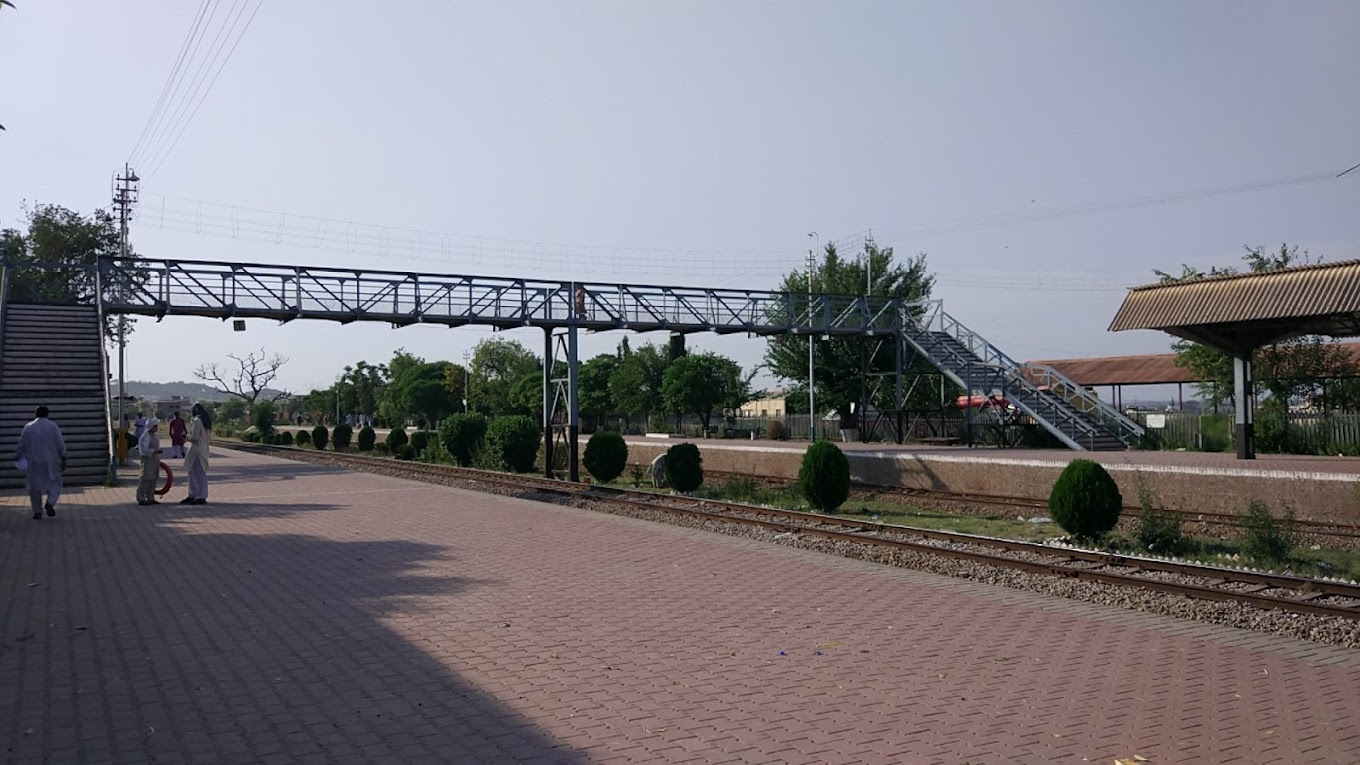

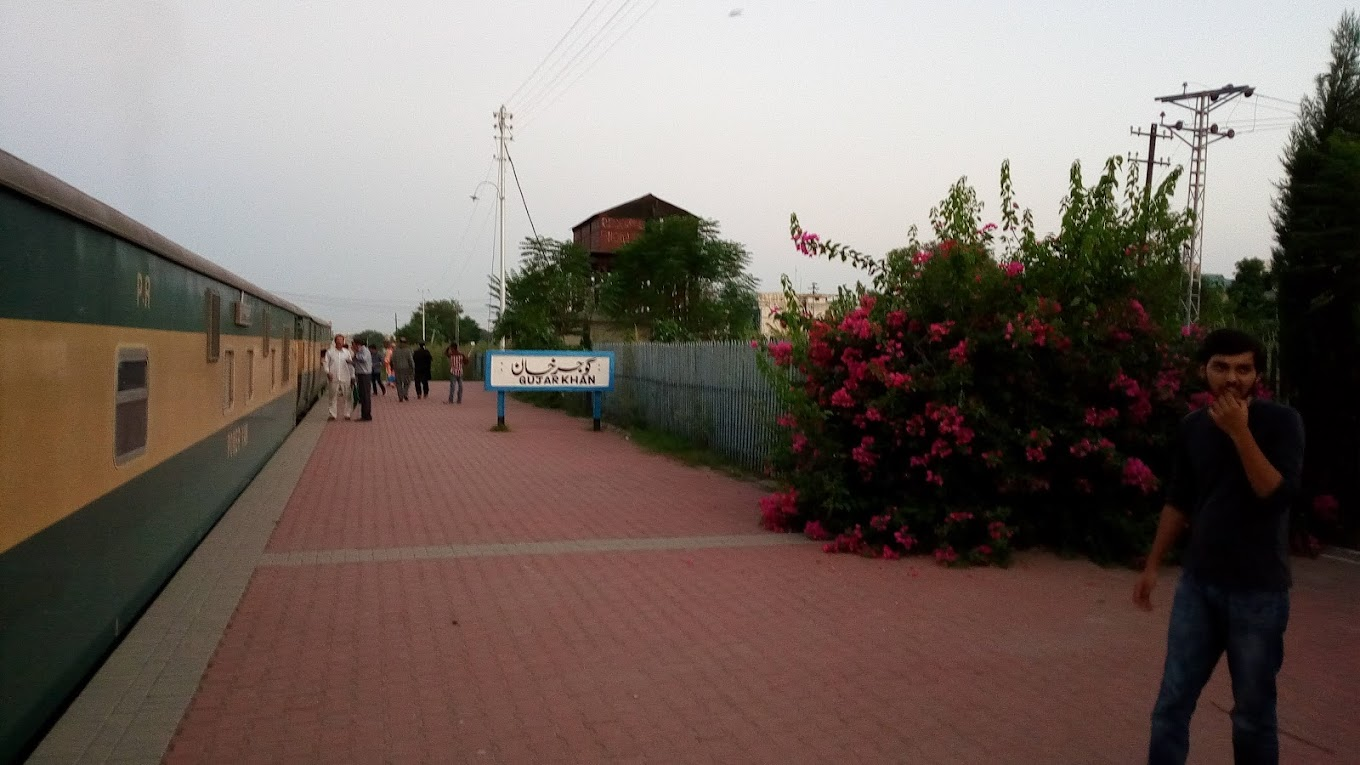

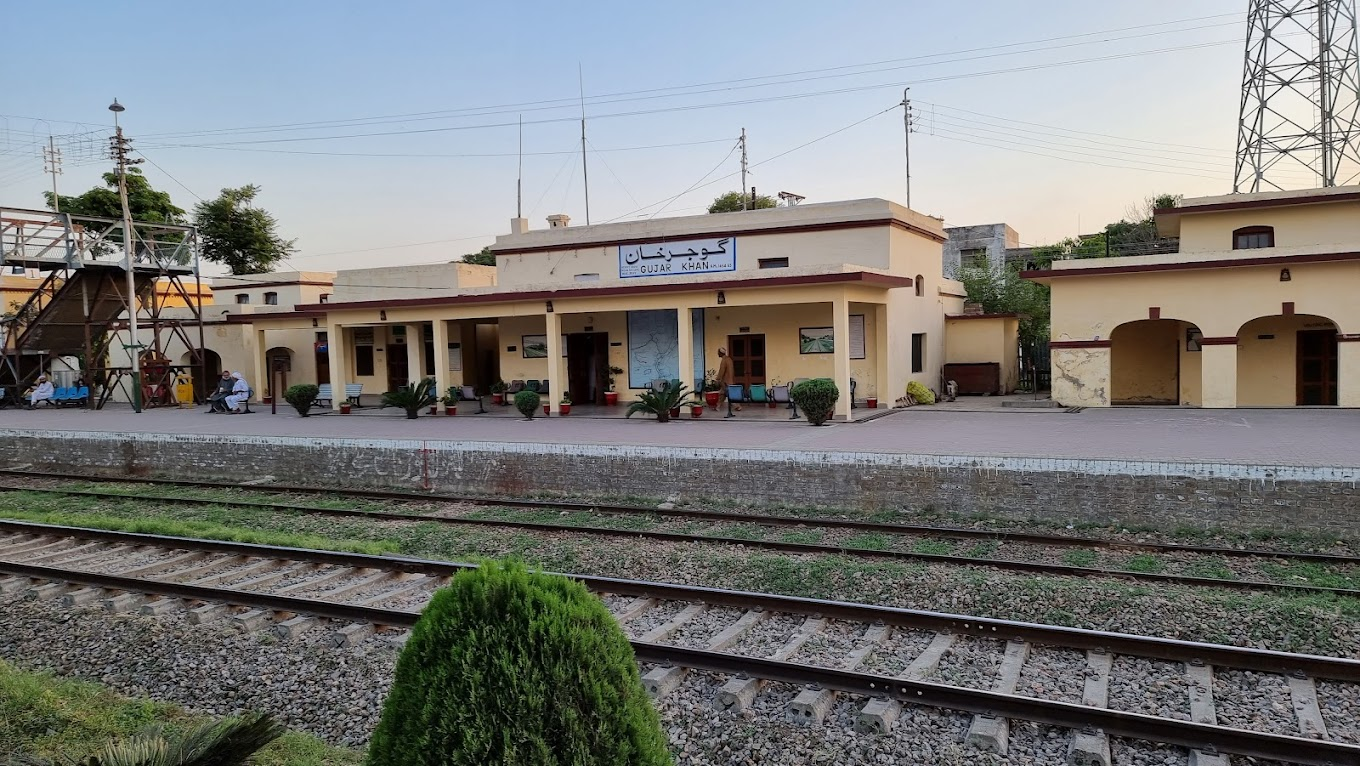

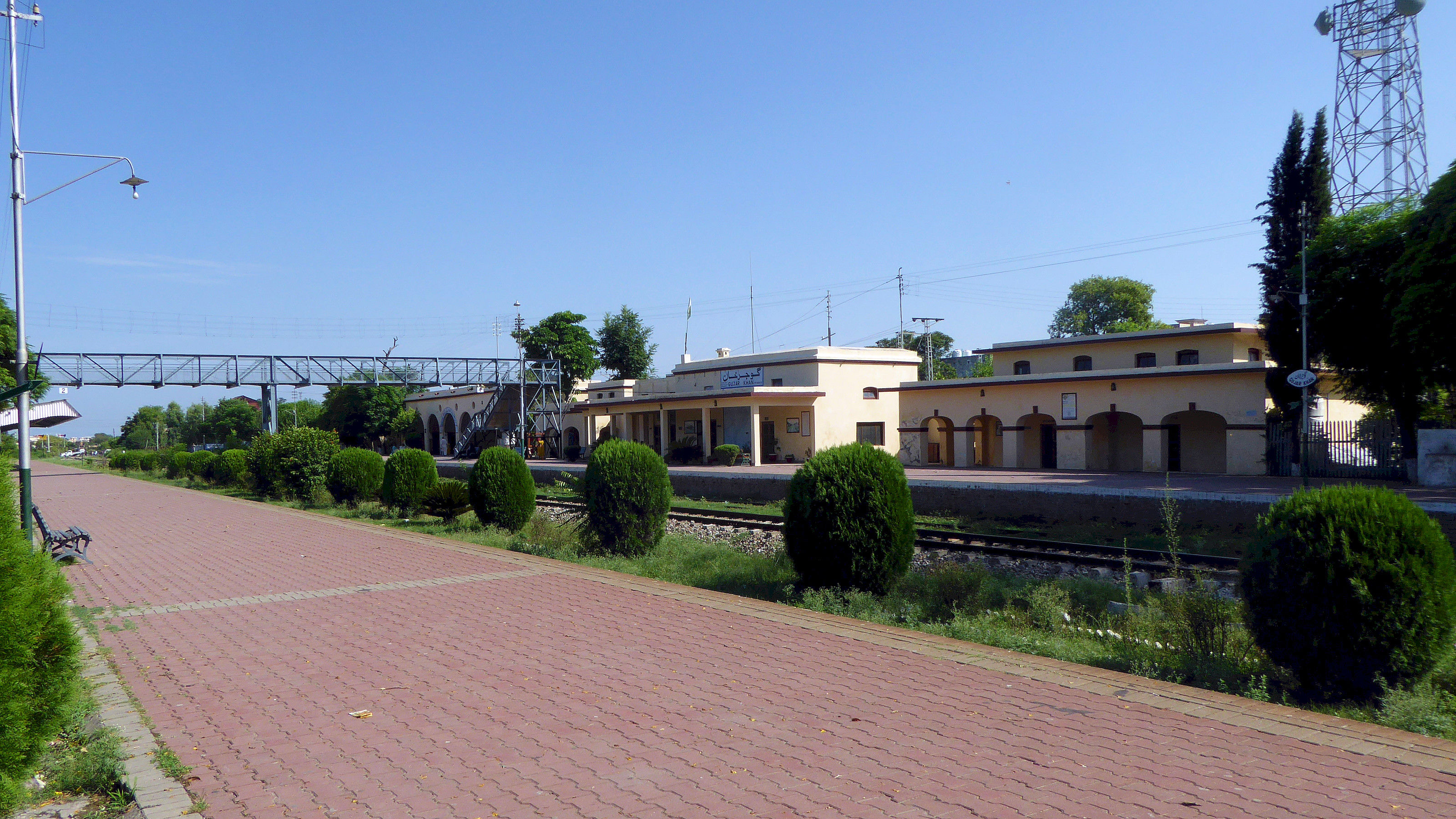
View from platform 2

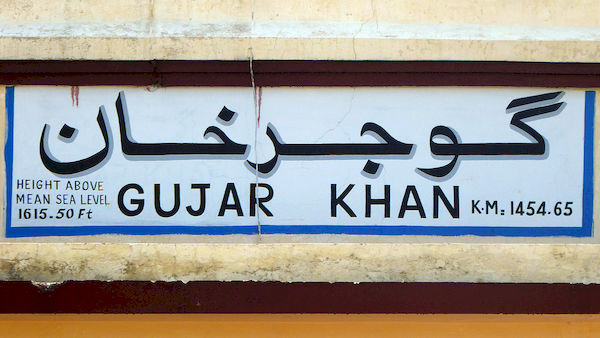
Station tag

== See also ==
- List of railway stations in Pakistan
- Pakistan Railways
- Rawalpindi Railway Station
- Lahore Railway Station
- Quetta Railway Station
- Peshawar Railway Station
