= Ghungrila railway station =

Railway station in Punjab, Pakistan

Ghungrila Railway Station گھنگریلہ ریلوے اسٹیشن
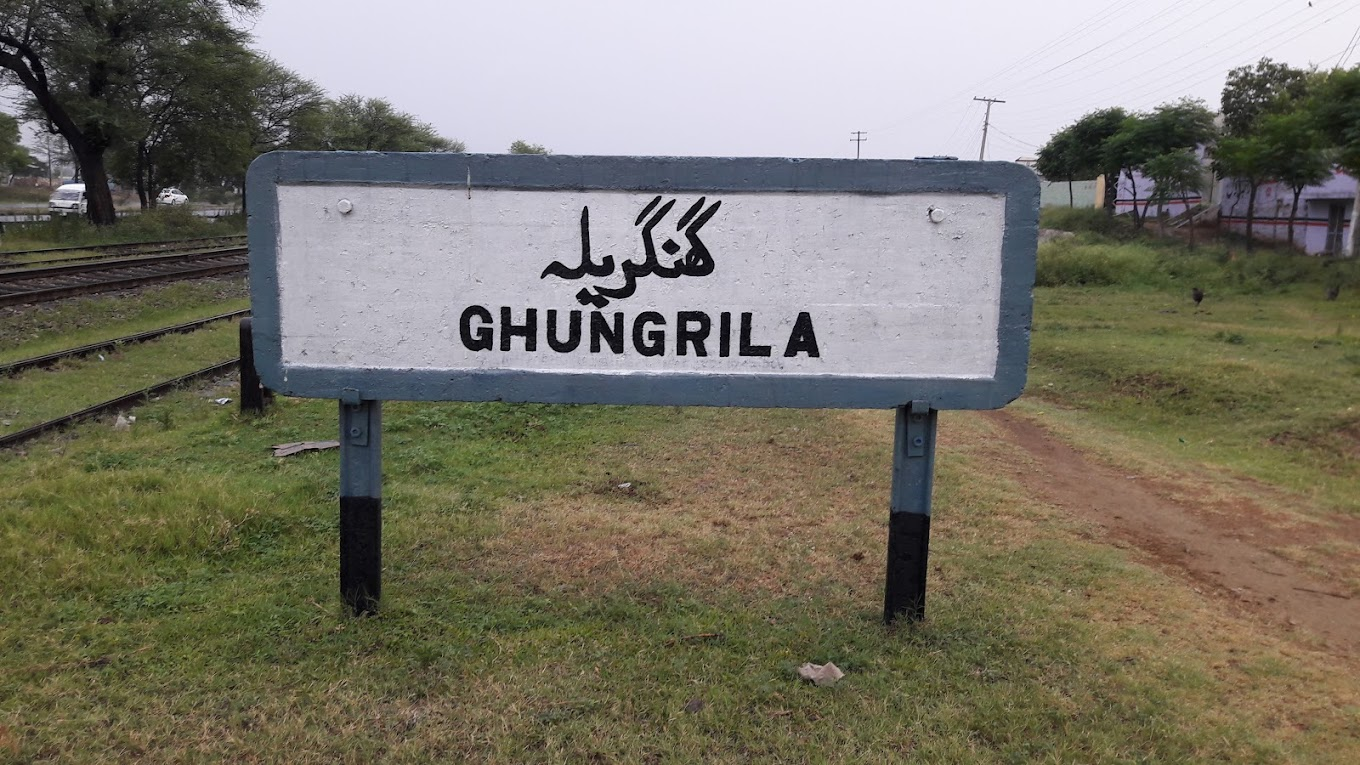

General information
- Coordinates: 33.3012°N 73.2659°E
- Owner: Ministry of Railways
- Line: Karachi–Peshawar Railway Line

Other information
- Station code: GNX

Services
Preceding station	Pakistan Railways	Following station
Gujar Khan towards Kiamari	Karachi–Peshawar Line	Mandra Junction towards Peshawar Cantonment
Location

Ghungrila Railway Station (Urdu and Punjabi: گھنگریلہ ریلوے اسٹیشن) is an abandoned railway station located next to Chehari Bangial village, Rawalpindi district of Punjab, Pakistan.

== See also ==
- List of railway stations in Pakistan
- Pakistan Railways

== Gallery ==
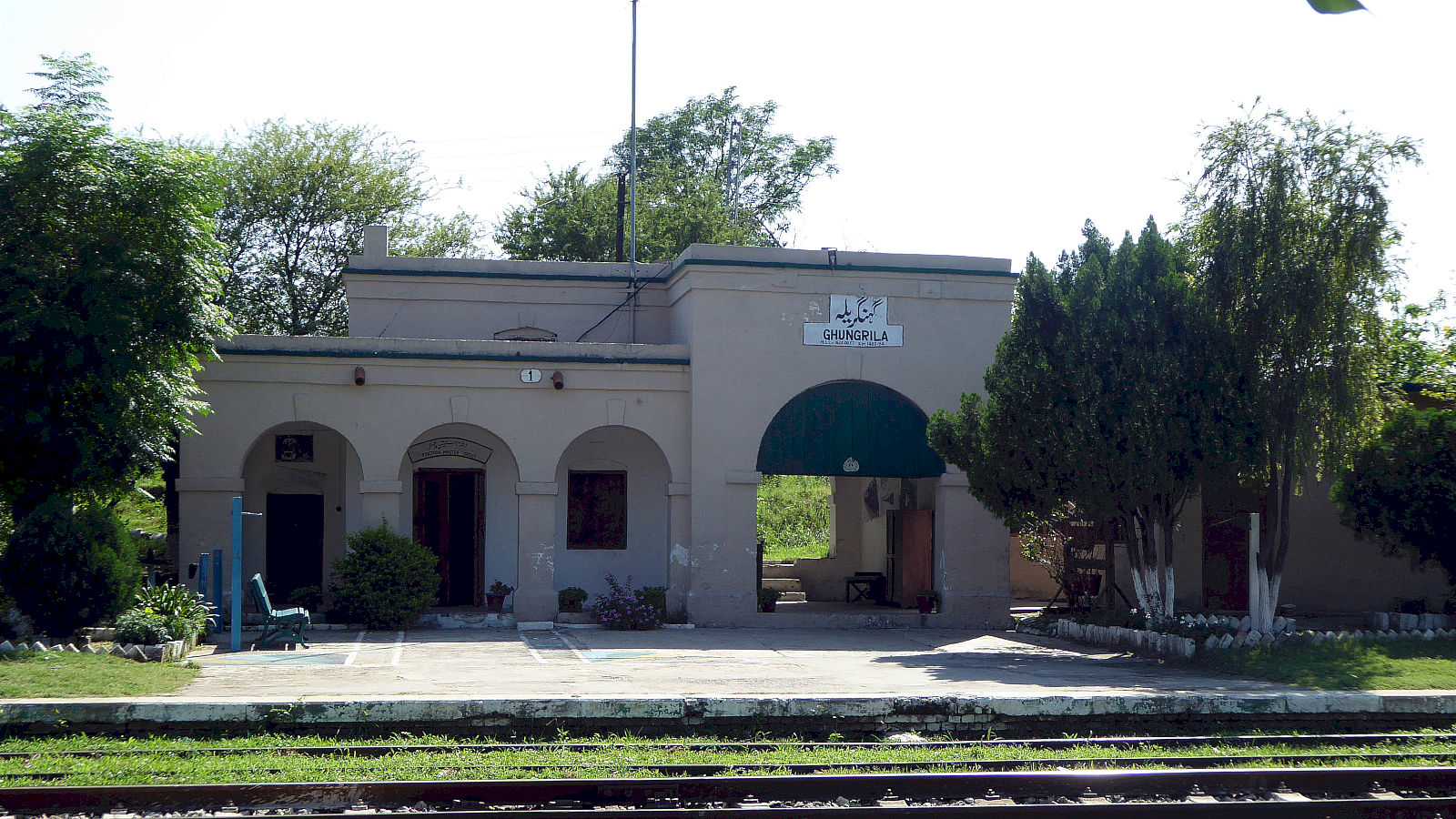
Ghungrila railway station

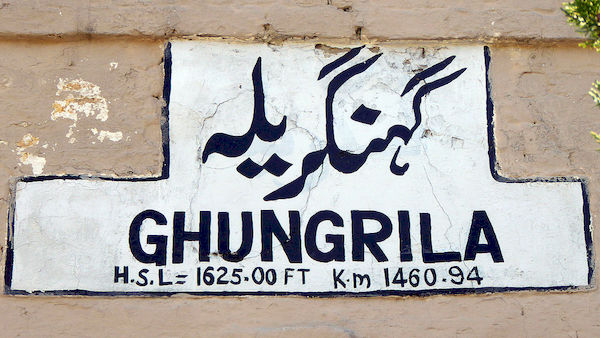
Ghungrila railway station tag
