= Pindbala =

- Village
- Country: Pakistan
- Province: Punjab
- District: Rawalpindi

Area
  - Total: 5 km^{2} (1.9 sq mi)

Population (2010)
  - Total: 1,000
- Time zone: UTC+4 (PST)
- Calling code: 051

Pindbala is a village located at 50 km south of Rawalpindi on Chakwal Road Near Islamabad Pakistan. Awan and Ghakkar(kayani) is the major tribe of Pindbala who moved to Pindbala more than 200 years ago. Pindbala is in Tehsil Gujarkhan and district Rawalpindi. Pindbala village is amidst beautiful hills and green scenery. Most of the people of this village are government employees and some have a military background. This village has two government schools for girls and boys.

The main crops of Pindbala are wheat, corn and peanuts.
