= Missa Keswal railway station =

Railway station in Punjab, Pakistan

Coordinates: 33.197947°N 73.366892°E

Missa Keswal Railway Station مسہ کسوال ریلوے اسٹیشن
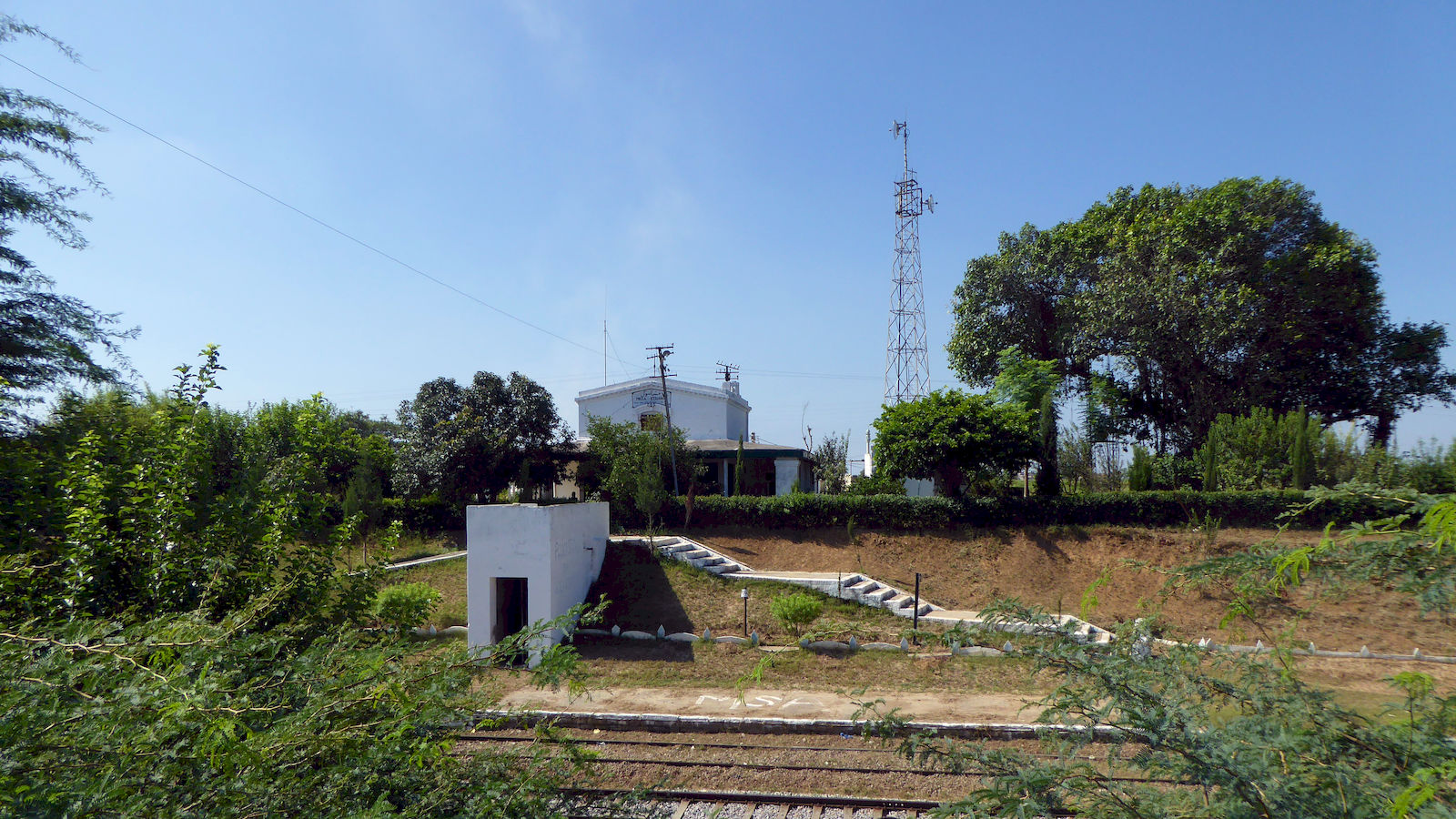

General information
- Owner: Ministry of Railways
- Line: Karachi–Peshawar Railway Line

Other information
- Station code: MSA

Services
Preceding station	Pakistan Railways	Following station
Sohawa towards Kiamari	Karachi–Peshawar Line	Gujar Khan towards Peshawar Cantonment
Location

Missa Keswal Railway Station (Urdu and Punjabi: مسہ کسوال ریلوے اسٹیشن) is located in Missa Keswal, Rawalpindi district of Punjab province of the Pakistan.

== See also ==
- List of railway stations in Pakistan
- Pakistan Railways

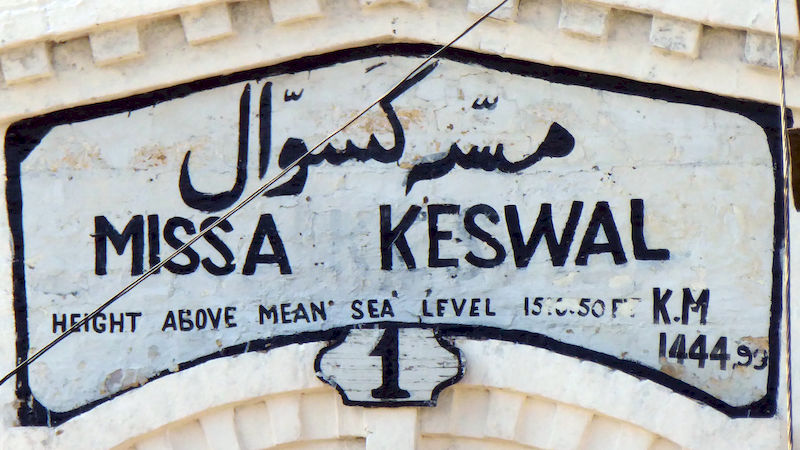
Missa Keswal railway station tag
