= Bhadana =

Town in Gujar Khan Tehsil, Punjab, Pakistan

Coordinates: 32°39′N 74°07′E

- Union Council
- Interactive map of Bhadana
- Country: Pakistan
- Province: Punjab
- District: Rawalpindi
- Tehsil: Gujar Khan

Population (2015)
  - Total: 3,000

Bhadana (Urdu: بھڈانه) is a town and union council in Gujar Khan Tehsil, Punjab, Pakistan.

Bhadana is also the chief town of Union Council Bhadana which is an administrative subdivision of the Tehsil.
