= Jatli =

Jatli جاتلی
- Town and Union Council (U.C.)
- Interactive map of Jatli
- Coordinates: 33°12′15.85″N 73°6′28.34″E
- Country: Pakistan
- Region: Punjab
- District: Rawalpindi
- Tehsil: Gujjar Khan
- Time zone: UTC+5 (PST)

Jatli (Urdu: جاتلى) is a chief town in Gujjar Khan Tehsil, Rawalpindi District of the Punjab province of Pakistan. Jatli is also the chief town of Union Council Jatli which is an administrative subdivision of the Tehsil.

== History ==
The foundation of Jatli was laid by a person named Jatal. It was later awarded to Rai Dalla as a gift for his bravery. After that, Akbar Khan and Mohabbat Khan took possession of this land.

Jatli is a historic settlement in Gujar Khan Tehsil of Rawalpindi District, Punjab, Pakistan. Today, it is recognised as a town and the principal settlement of Union Council Jatli. Situated within the wider Pothohar region, Jatli forms part of a landscape historically characterised by agricultural communities, rural settlements, traditional clan structures and important routes linking Rawalpindi, Gujar Khan, Mandra and Chakwal.

The historical significance of Jatli becomes particularly evident when its present-day status is examined alongside the records preserved in the Punjab Gazetteer. These historical records demonstrate that Jatli was already an established settlement with administrative and communications importance during the British period. It was identified as one of the principal police jurisdictions of Gujar Khan Tahsil, alongside Gujar Khan and Mandra. The Gazetteer also records a cattle-pound at Jatli and identifies the settlement as an important point on the road connecting Mandra with the Chakwal direction.

Modern sources, including gazetteers and local historical accounts, further preserve traditions concerning the origin of the settlement and the families and communities associated with its development. Taken together, these documentary and traditional sources provide a broader picture of Jatli's historical and cultural development.

== Generation of Jatli ==
Jatli is mainly held by Suryavanshi Thathaal Rajputs and origin is Kashmir as they are descendants of Raja Karan (ruler of Kashmir) and further took over by his son Raja Thathu who first converted to Islam. They were expelled/displaced from their native place during Mughal regime in 16th century. Raja Thathu's offspring namely Muhabbat Khan, Akber Khan and their sister came to Jatli during Mughal reign and made their home at a central spot under a big Pepal (ficus religiosa) tree. The tree still stands in the courtyard of Choudhry Sahar Gul.
