= Manghot =

- Village
- Location in Pakistan
- Coordinates: 33.289°N 73.114°E
- Country: Pakistan
- Province: Punjab
- District: Rawalpindi
- Settled: AD 1600
- Elevation: 447 m (1,467 ft)

Population (2015)
  - Total: 250+
- Time zone: UTC+5 (PST)

Manghot (Urdu: منگھوٹ) is a town which is located in Gujar Khan Tehsil, Rawalpindi District, Punjab, Pakistan. Kayani is a major tribe in Gujar Khan Tehsil which claims ancestry from the Kayanian dynasty and Janjua Rajput is also a major tribe which belongs to Ranjali, Jattal and Mohra Shera Village Tribe Awan [Malik] belong to Dohk Main Naik Muhammad in Union Council Manghot.

== See also ==
- General Ashfaq Parvez Kayani - Ex Chief of Army Staff (COAS)
- Kayani clan
- Janjua Rajput
