= Sukho =

- Union Council
- Country: Pakistan
- Province: Punjab
- District: Rawalpindi
- Tehsil: Gujar Khan
- Post Code: GK29

Government
  - Nazim: Choudary Ibrar Sarwar
  - Naib Nazim: Haji Yaseen

Sukho (Urdu: سُكھو) is a Union Council of Gujar Khan, Rawalpindi District, Punjab, Pakistan. It is located 3.5 km south of the Sukho Mor stop at the Mandra-Chakwal Road and is connected with Gujar Khan (12.5 km) via Sukho-Gujar Khan Road.

== Education ==
Following are the some popular and the best schools of Sukho:

- Government Boys Primary School Sukho
- Government Islamia High School Sukho (for Boys)
- Government Girls High School Sukho
- City Service School Sukho & College
- United Public School Sukho
- Al-Amir Foundation Education System Sukho
- Yousaf Public High School Sukho
- The Growth Scientific School System Sukho
- The Bluebells School System Sukho
- Wings College For Girls Sukho
- Dilawaiz Academy Sukho. Computer Training Institute, Project of Dilawaiz Welfare

== Health Facilities ==
Sukho has a Basic Health Unit (BHU) located on the outskirts of the town toward the North-West. It provides basic health services free of cost, including maternity related services.

The town also has several private clinics and medical doctors providing basic health related services. A local pharma enterprise known as Kamal Laboratories is situated in the town as well. It is well known to manufacture and export various homeopathic drugs in Pakistan and abroad. The founding unit of the laboratories is located in Sukho since 1967.

== Post Office ==
Sukho has a post office which provides postal and pension services to the people of area.

== Bank ==
A branch of Muslim Commercial Bank (MCB) is located near the Lari-Adda. It offers Islamic banking services as well.
