= Kauntrila =

- Union council
- Country: Pakistan
- Province: Punjab
- District: Rawalpindi
- Tehsil: Gujar Khan

Kauntrila (also spelled Kuntrila) (کونتریلہ) is a village and union council of Gujar Khan Tehsil in Rawalpindi District of the Punjab province Pakistan. Kauntrila is a populated small town among few of old towns in Gujar Khan Tehsil. It is also a union council of Gujar Khan Tehsil.

Raja Pervaiz Ashraf, who served as Prime Minister of Pakistan from 22 June 2012 until completing his designated term on 16 March 2013 has his maternal side of his family in kauntrila.

Lieutenant General retired Nadeem Anjum is a three-star general in the Pakistan Army, who served as the 30th Director-General of the ISI hails from the village of Kauntrila.

== History ==
=== Establishment ===
According to historical records and oral tradition, the village was founded in the 13th century by Raja Koal Pakhral, a chief of the Pakhral Rajputs. Kauntrilla remained the seat of the chieftains of the Pakhral Rajput Tribe till the 18th century. Sultan Muqarab Khan of the Gakhars, attacked Kauntrilla to take revenge against Pakhral Chieftain Raja Yousaf Khan Pakhral for killing Hashim Khan Sadaal.

=== The Bakhshis of Kauntrilla ===
Following a mid-18th century conflict with the Gakhars, Kauntrila suffered significant destruction. The village was subsequently resettled by the Bakhshi family of Basali.

The Bakshis trace their ancestry to Bakhshi Lajja Singh, who served as a general and administrative officer under Ahmad Shah Abdali. Gohar Singh, Bakhshi Lajja Singh's eldest grandson, was born in 1777. The family migrated during his lifetime to Kauntrilla. The family held prominent roles in administration and military service for generations.

=== Maari Haveli ===
One of the most notable historical structures in Kauntrila is the Maari Haveli, built by Bakhshi Ram Singh in 1886. Known as Ucchi Maari (High Tower) by the locals, the haveli is three storeys high and includes an octagonal observation tower, with a view of the surrounding villages. The haveli has 11 rooms, jharokas (overhanging balconies) and covers a large central courtyard. After the Bakhshis left Kauntrilla in 1947, the building was used as the Government Boys High School, Kauntrila, until 1975. Today, the building is a property of the local revenue department.

=== After the Partition ===
During the Partition of India in 1947, communal riots affected the region. Members of the Sikh Bakhshi family, along with other Sikh residents, left Kauntrila and migrated to India, leaving behind their properties.

After Partition, Kauntrila continued to function as a village and union council. The Maari Haveli served as a government school until 1975, after which it became largely abandoned and deteriorated over the decades.

== Geography ==
Kauntrila is situated in the south of Gujjar Khan city in Gujar Khan Tehsil. It is surrounded by the villages of Sasral and Kot Amb. Kauntrila is connected through a link road with Gujar khan-Daultala Road at Sasral and Sohawa-Chakwal Road at Dhoke Amb.

The popular villages that fall in kauntrila town are Dhoke Rajgan, Mohra Mari, Mohra Jharian, Mohra Kalyal, Kolian Hameed, Kharali, Garmala, Hafial and Mohri Rajgan.

== Development ==
Kauntrila is connected through a link road with Gujar khan-Daultala Road at Sasral and Sohawa-Chakwal Road at Dhoke Amb. There is one Girls High School and one Boys Higher Secondary School. A Rural Health Centre is also working here. Play Grounds of Boys Higher Secondary School are the biggest in Rawalpindi District. Like many other places Kauntrila also suffers with lack of medical facilities.
