= Sahang =

Pakistani town

Coordinates: 33°03′N 73°49′E

- Town
- Location within Pakistan
- Country: Pakistan
- Province: Punjab
- District: Rawalpindi
- Time zone: UTC+5 (PST)

Sahang (ساہنگ) is a town in Gujar Khan Tehsil, Punjab, Pakistan. It is the administrative centre of Union Council Sahang, one of the largest union councils in the tehsil. Raja Sajjad Sarwar is Chairman of the Union Council.

The notable tribes of this union council are Sadaat (Dera Syedan), Pakhral Rajpoot Minhas, Gakhars, Awan Malik, Dar, Rajput, Gujar, Bhatti, and Nagrial.
