= Ghungrila =

Coordinates: 33°18′0″N 73°15′0″E

- Union council
- Interactive map of Ghungrila
- Country: Pakistan
- Province: Punjab
- District: Rawalpindi
- Tehsil: Gujar Khan

Ghungrila (Urdu: گُھنگريله) is a medium-size town in Gujar Khan Tehsil Punjab, Pakistan. Gungrila is also chief town of Union Council Gungrila, which is an administrative subdivision of the Tehsil. The town is located at 33°18'0"North, 73° 15' 0" East.

== History ==
Before the partition, the town was home to a large and notable Sikh population.Now many Kashmiri families are settled there.
