= Islampura Jabbar =

Coordinates: 33°18′N 73°29′E

- Town - Union Council
- Location within Pakistan
- Country: Pakistan
- Province: Punjab, Pakistan
- District: Rawalpindi
- Tehsil: Gujar Khan
- Capital: Islampura Jabbar
- Time zone: UTC+5 (PST)

Islampura Jabbar is a town in Tehsil Gujar Khan, in Rawalpindi District, in Punjab, Pakistan.

== Facilities ==
The town has a Jamia Masjid, a post office, a boys higher secondary school and a girls higher secondary school. There are around 1,500 shops and 5 banks, lots of food places, pizza burgers etc. There are few privately owned schools for boys and girls. Every year in march there is a mela (funfair) under the name of baba Sain Mirchoo Qalandar, mainly on 5/6/7 of march, events of the mela are Kabbdi match, horse dance, bull race and other traditional activities. Free food called langar is available for all three days by Darbar management.

== Near by Villages ==
The surrounding villages are Qazian, Manjotha, Pandori, Jabber Jattan, Pandori Bangyal, Goleen, Banair Kaswal, Doke Kallaryan, Dhok Sherpa, Dhok Hashmat Ali, Muhree, and Rohraha, Ratalla, Muhara Bhuttian, Dhok Nawais Ali, Dhoke Jaari, lass, Malik Pur, Sohawa Mirza, Sadiqabad, Peem, Balham, Jameel Pura, Qadir Bakhs, Dhok Sir, Chani, DHOK BHATTIAN, Muhra Shahan, Darkal, Kajoori, Miani borgi malot pakhral, Malot Kaswal, Jabbar Village, Kangar Mandhal Paleena and its small villages like Thathi, Thigri, Luss, Meraa etc.
