= Noor Dolal =

Pakistani village

Coordinates: 33°23′N 73°18′E

Noor Dalal
- Village
- Noordolal
- Location within Pakistan
- Country: Pakistan
- Province: Punjab (Pakistan)
- District: Rawalpindi

Population (2017)
  - Total: 2,819
- Time zone: UTC+5 (PST)
- Calling code: 0513

Noordolal, also spelled Noor Dolal (Urdu: نوردولال), is one of the oldest villages in Gujar Khan Tehsil, Rawalpindi District, Punjab, Pakistan. Located 40 km southeast of Rawalpindi, this village was once a bustling hub for the local community. It served as a central point for shopping and activities, featuring several grocery stores, a Jamia Masjid (congregational mosque), schools for both boys and girls, and a post office.

Noordolal is the central village, with smaller surrounding, including Bunmera (also known as Dhoke Major after (Major M. Anwer Qureshi of Bunmera), Dhoke Aarra, Dhoke Gumti, Dhoke Gurrah, Dhoke Mir Afzal Shaheed, and Dhoke Lamian.

There are educational institutions such as a girls' middle school in Dhoke Qureshian (Dhoke Lamian) and a boys' middle school in Noor Dolal, the land was donated by Major M Anwer Qureshi. The village is also home to the Basic Health Unit for the Union Council, located at Ghousia Chowk, which serves as the main shopping centre for Noordolal. This article's information has been provided by Waji Qureshi,M Imran Qureshi,Ali Anwer Qureshi,Umer Qureshi.
