= Bangial =

- بنگیال
- Jāti: Rajput
- Religions: Islam
- Languages: Punjabi
- Country: Pakistan
- Region: Punjab
- Ethnicity: Punjabi
- Family names: yes

Bangial is a Punjabi Rajput Muslim tribe of Panwar Rajputs, found principally in the Pothohar region of Punjab, Pakistan. They are named after their ancestor Raja Bangash Khan, whose forefathers migrated from Dhara Nagri (now Dhar, India). They are also present in Gujrat, Darya Khan Tehsil, Jhelum, Azad Jammu & Kashmir and Gujranwala districts in Punjab.
