= Mandrah =

Coordinates: 33°21′059.89″N 73°14′22.69″E

- Union council
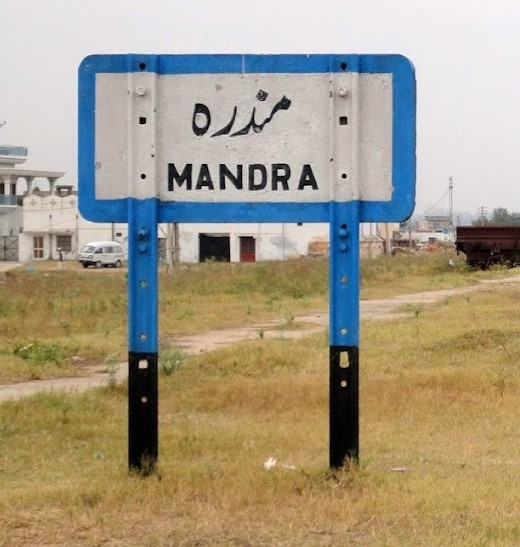
- Interactive map of Mandrah
- Country: Pakistan
- Province: Punjab
- District: Rawalpindi
- Tehsil: Gujar Khan

Population (2021 (estimated))
  - Total: 21,707

Mandrah (Urdu: مندره) is a town of Tehsil Gujar Khan, Rawalpindi District, Punjab, Pakistan. It is also known as the city of Rajpoots with castes like Janjua, Chib, Jasgam and Bhatti. Mandrah itself is also the chief town of Union Council Mandrah which is an administrative subdivision of the Tehsil. It is situated approximately 35 km (22 mi) south of Rawalpindi. It is located at 33°21'059.89" North, 73° 14' 22.69" East. Pothwari, which resembles Punjabi, is the predominant spoken language of the region.

== History ==
Mandrah – History

Mandrah is a historic town located in Tehsil Gujar Khan, District Rawalpindi, in the Punjab, Pakistan. It has long been an important settlement due to its strategic location on trade and communication routes.

Early History

The history of Mandrah dates back several centuries. The region was part of the ancient Northern Punjab plateau and remained under various local rulers before becoming part of the Mughal Empire in the 16th century. During the Mughal period, the area developed as an agricultural and trading hub due to fertile land and its connection to nearby towns.

Sikh and British Era

In the late 18th and early 19th centuries, Mandra came under the rule of the Sikh Empire led by Maharaja Ranjit Singh after they captured it from the Gakhars. During this time, the region remained stable and continued to grow economically.

After the decline of the Sikh Empire, Mandrah was annexed by the British following the Second Anglo-Sikh War. Under British Raj, Mandrah gained significant importance due to the development of railway infrastructure.

Railway Development

Mandrah became a key railway junction during British rule. The Mandra–Chakwal–Bhaun Railway Line was constructed in the early 20th century, connecting Mandrah with Chakwal and surrounding areas. This railway line played a crucial role in trade, transportation, and economic growth of the region. Although the railway is no longer operational, its legacy remains an important part of Mandra’s history. Today, Mandrah is known for its historical significance and its role as a link between Rawalpindi and Chakwal regions. It continues to grow with improvements in road infrastructure and urban development while preserving its cultural heritage.

== Mandrah railway station ==
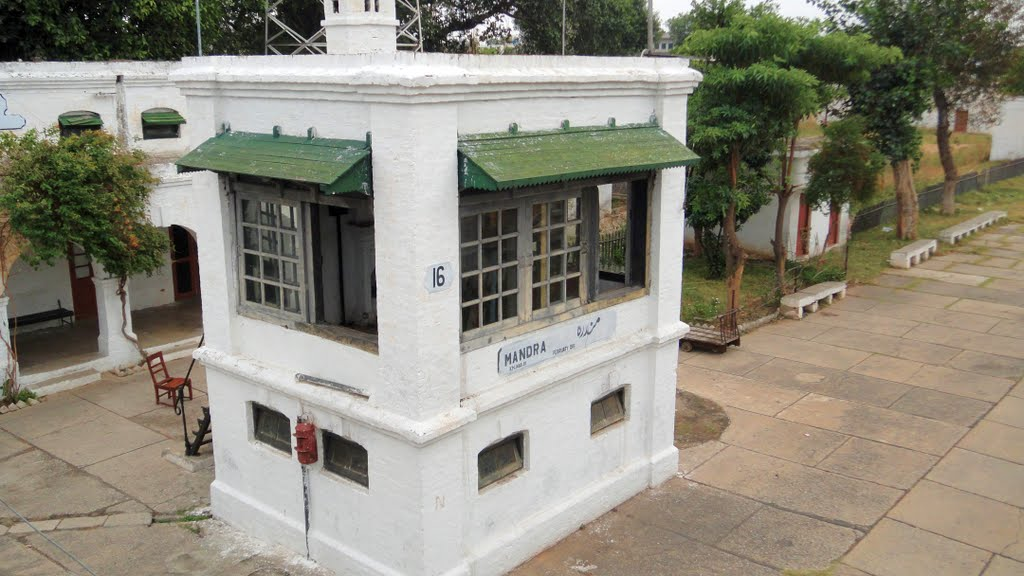
Mandrah Railway Station

Mandra Junction railway station is on the main Peshawar to Karachi railway line. It is situated 40 km (25 mi) from Rawalpindi. Mandrah is also the railway junction from where the train goes to Chakwal, though currently the Mandra-Chakwal Line is non-operational.

== Post office ==
There is a post office in Mandrah providing postal services to the locality.

City / Town	Post Code	Tehsil / Tehsil P.O.	District / District / G.P.O.	Province
Mandrah	47670	Gujar Khan	Rawalpindi	Punjab
