= Bewal =

- Union Council
- Location within Pakistan Location within Punjab, Pakistan
- Coordinates: 33.3392°N 73.4447°E
- Country: Pakistan
- Province: Punjab
- District: Rawalpindi
- Tehsil: Kallar Syedan

Bewal (Punjabi and Urdu: بیول) is a town and Union Council in Pakistan's Punjab province. It is situated in the Kallar Syedan Tehsil of Rawalpindi District.

== Notable people ==
- Sayeeda Warsi, British politician whose parents came from Bewal
- Iftikhar Ahmed Warsi, Local politician from Bewal
