= Gujar Khan Tehsil =

Administrative geographic division Tehsil in Punjab, Pakistan

Gujar Khan Tehsil گُجر خاں تحصِیل (Punjabi) تحصِیل گُوجر خان (Urdu)
- Tehsil

- Country: Pakistan
- Province: Punjab
- Division: Rawalpindi
- District: Rawalpindi
- Capital: Gujar Khan
- Union councils: 36

Government
  - MNA: Raja Pervaiz Ashraf
  - MPA: Chaudhary Javed Kausar
  - MPA: Raja Shoukat Aziz Bhatti
  - Mayor: vacant

Area
  - Tehsil: 1,457 km^{2} (563 sq mi)
- Elevation: 461 m (1,512 ft)

Population (2023)
  - Tehsil: 781,578
  - Density: 536.4/km^{2} (1,389/sq mi)
  - Urban: ...
  - Rural: ...

Literacy (2023)
  - Literacy rate: 79.72%
- Time zone: UTC+5 (PST)

Gujar Khan Tehsil (Punjabi: گُجر خاں تحصِیل; Urdu: تحصِیل گُوجر خان), headquartered at Gujar Khan, is one of the tehsils (sub-divisions) of Rawalpindi District in the Punjab province of Pakistan. It is administratively subdivided into 36 Union Councils, and according to the 1998 census, has a population of 42,000. In the 2017 census, Gujar Khan had a population of 678,503.

== History ==
The tehsil of Gujar Khan was described in the Imperial Gazetteer of India, compiled during the first decade of the twentieth century, as follows:

"Southern tahsil of Rawalpindi District, Punjab, lying between 33°4′ and 33°26′ N. and 72°56′ and 73°37′ E., with an area of 567 square miles. It is bounded on the east by the Jhelum river, which cuts it off from Kashmir territory. Except for a low ridge of sandstone hills along the Jhelum, the tehsil consists of a plain intersected by numerous ravines. The population in 1901 was 150,566, compared with 152,455 in 1891. It contains 381 villages, of which Gujar Khan is the headquarters. The land revenue and cesses in 1903-4 amounted to 2-7 lakhs."

During the period of British rule, Gujar Khan Tehsil increased in population and importance. The predominantly Muslim population supported Muslim League and Pakistan Movement. After the independence of Pakistan in 1947, the minority Hindus and Sikhs migrated to India while the Muslims refugees from India settled down in the Rawalpindi District.

== Administration ==
The tehsil of Gujar Khan is administratively subdivided into 36 Union Councils, these are:

- Bewal
- Bhata Sharif
- Noor Dolal
- Bhadana
- Changa Bangial
- Changa Maira
- Daultala
- Devi, Punjab
- Gujar Khan-I
- Gujar Khan-II
- Gujar Khan-III
- Gulyana
- Gungrila
- Jand Mehlo
- Jarmot Kalan
- Jatli
- Jhungle
- Kalyam Awan
- Kaniat Khalil
- Karumb Ilyas
- Kauntrila
- Kuri Dolal
- Mandrah
- Manghot
- Mankiala Branmma
- Matwa
- Mohra Noori
- Narali
- Punjgran Kalan
- Qazian
- Raman
- Sahang
- Sui Cheemian
- Sukho
- Syed Kasran
- Thathi
- Islampura Jabbar

== Demographics ==
=== Population ===
As of the 2023 census, Gujar Khan Tehsil had a population of 781,578.

== See also ==
- List of Union Councils of Gujar Khan Tehsil
- Tehsils of Pakistan
  - Tehsils of Punjab
- Districts of Pakistan
  - Districts of Punjab
- Divisions of Pakistan
  - Divisions of Punjab
