= Gujar Khan =

City in Punjab, Pakistan

Gujar Khan گوجر خان
- City
- Gujar Khan

- Location within Punjab, Pakistan Location within Pakistan
- Coordinates: 33.253°N 73.304°E
- Country: Pakistan
- Province: (Punjab, Pakistan) Punjab
- Division: Rawalpindi
- District: Rawalpindi
- Tehsil: Gujar Khan

Government
  - Type: Municipal Committee
  - Chairman: Vacant
  - Vice-Chairman: Vacant
- Elevation: 461 m (1,512 ft)

Population (2023)
  - City: 103,284
  - Rank: 121st in Pakistan

Society
  - Languages: Punjabi (native and majority); Urdu (minority)
- Time zone: UTC+5 (PST)
- Calling code: 0513
- Founder: Gujjars
- Number of union councils: 36

Gujar Khan or Gujjar Khan (Punjabi: گُجر خاں [ɡʊˈd͡ʒəɾ ˈxãː]; Urdu: گوجر خان [ˈɡoːdʒəɾ ˈxaːn]) is a city in Rawalpindi District, Punjab, Pakistan. It is also the headquarters of Gujar Khan Tehsil, the largest tehsil of Punjab by land area.

Gujar Khan is located approximately 57 km (35 mi) southeast of Islamabad, the capital of Pakistan, and 220 km (140 mi) to the northwest of Lahore, the capital of Punjab. It is bounded on the north by Rawalpindi, Islamabad, and Attock, on the south by Jhelum, Lahore, and Gujrat, on the east by Azad Kashmir, and Kahuta and on the west by Chakwal and Khushab.

Situated in the heart of the Pothohar Plateau in northern Punjab, the city and surrounding region is renowned for their martial culture and is sometimes referred to as the 'Land of Martyrs', having produced two recipients of the Nishan-i-Haider.

== History ==
Gujjar Khan city took its name from the Punjabi Gujjar community who are the oldest inhabitants of the city. Apart from the city, many Gujjar families live in the Gujar Khan Tehsil. The modern town was developed by the British colonial authorities after the region came under British rule in 1848.

== Administration ==
Administrative subdivisions of Rawalpindi District

Gujar Khan is administratively subdivided into 36 union councils, whereas City Gujar Khan is administered by municipal corporation.

== Demographics ==
Population of Gujar Khan city over the years.

Historical population
Year	Pop.	±%
1951	8,496	—
1961	11,529	+35.7%
1972	24,121	+109.2%
1981	33,920	+40.6%
1998	57,099	+68.3%
2017	90,149	+57.9%
2023	103,284	+14.6%

=== Social groups ===
Gujjar is a major and oldest ethnic group in the city. Other ethnic groups in the city include Rajput, Arain, Jat, Kashmiri.

=== Languages ===
Urban Population of Gujar Khan Tehsil (2023)
1. Punjabi (61.9%)
2. Urdu (20.3%)
3. Pashto (9.36%)
4. "Others" (7.71%)
5. Others (0.71%)

According to the 2023 census, Punjabi is the dominant first language, spoken by 61.90% of the population, followed by Urdu at 20.32% and Pashto at 9.36% and 0.71% spoke other languages (mostly Sindhi and Saraiki). 7.71% of the population also chose the "Others" option as they did not consider their mother tongue to be present among the options.

== Natural resources ==
Large reserves of oil and gas were discovered in February 2002 at Tobra, about ten kilometres from Gujar Khan. The field is being developed by the Oil & Gas Development Company. The field could produce 1,600 barrels of crude oil daily. Missa Kaswal, Ahdi and Mastala are also a major sources of energy. Missa Kaswal is supplying several cubic meters of gas on a daily basis and large quantities of oil are also being extracted.

== Transport ==
=== Rail ===
The Gujar Khan railway station is located in the center of the city and provides links to Rawalpindi, Jhelum, and Lahore.

=== Road ===
Gujar Khan is located on the N5 National highway from Islamabad-Lahore. Railway Road links from the east of the city to the nearby towns of Bewal and Islampura. There are also many other minor roads linking the villages and towns of the region to the city.

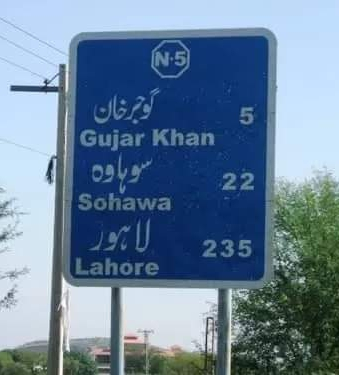

Local services also provide extensive bus routes to local towns, and smaller shuttles go around the villages in the surrounding area. There are also services to Rawalpindi, Islamabad, Jhelum, and Lahore.

Local auto-rickshaw drivers also provide transport for people in and around the city.

==== Electro buses ====
On 21 February 2026, a fleet of electric buses built in China started operating in the city. This is the first time the green public transport system has been implemented at the sub-district level in Punjab. The service connects Gujjar Khan with Rawat and Sohawa. These buses are a component of Punjab's larger shift to ecologically friendly public transportation. The vehicles, which run solely on electricity, are intended to encourage environmentally friendly mobility options, minimise fuel import prices, and lessen urban air pollution. Modern safety and surveillance systems, including seven onboard cameras to improve passenger security, are installed in every bus. In an effort to improve accessibility and promote the use of public transit, older citizens, women, and students have been given facility to ride for free.

== Notable people ==
- Chaudhry Muhammad Riaz, politician and ex-MNA
- Raja Muhammad Sarwar, first recipient of Nishan-e-Haider
- Mohammad Amir, cricketer
- Muhammad Javed Ikhlas, former MPA and MNA from Pakistan Muslim League (N)
- Raja Pervaiz Ashraf, Speaker National Assembly, former Prime Minister of Pakistan
- Muhammad Hussain Janjua, first soldier to be awarded Nishan-e-Haider
- Ashfaq Parvez Kayani, former Chief of Army Staff, Pakistan Army
- Najaf Shah, cricketer

== Friendship links ==
Gujar Khan also has formal "Friendship" links with:

- Redditch, Worcestershire, UK

== See also ==
- Sangni Fort
- List of Union Councils of Gujar Khan Tehsil
