= Chaudhary Muhammad Saqlain =

Pakistani politician

Ch Muhammad Saqlain (چوہدری محمد ثقلين )

Personal details
- Born: 1 November 1948 (age 77)
- Occupation: Politician
- Profession: Agriculturist

Ch Muhammad Saqlain (Urdu: چوہدری محمد ثقلين; born 1 November 1948) is a Pakistani politician associated with Pakistan Tehreek-e-Insaf. He is currently serving as PTI NA 66 candidate in Jhelum. He comes from a Jatt Tribe.

== Biography ==
Ch Muhammad Saqlain son of Ch Dhuman Khan was born on 1 November 1948, in Jhelum. He graduated in 1971 from Government Degree College, Jhelum. He served as a Member, District council Jhelum during 1987-92; remained Member, Provincial Assembly of the Punjab during 1993-96 and 2002–07; he was also appointed as Parliamentary Secretary, Excise & Taxation during 1993-95 and as Advisor to Chief Minister Punjab during 1995-96. He was elected for the third term as Member, Provincial Assembly of the Punjab in general elections 2008 independently.

== Political career ==
Chaudhary Muhammad Saqlain won PP-24, Jhelum in the 2008 Pakistani general election as independent candidate. After winning election he joined Pakistan Muslim League (N). In 2011 after Pakistan Tehreek-e-Insaf Jalsa at Lahore, he announced to join Imran Khan.

He contested the 2013 Pakistani general election unsuccessfully on Pakistan Tehreek-e-Insaf ticket from NA-66 (Jhelum-I). He obtained 62,572 votes against Pakistan Muslim League (N)'s candidate Chaudhry Khadim Hussain.

In 2016, Fawad Chaudhry joined PTI, he pursued party leadership to give ticket of NA-66 (Jhelum-I) to his cousin Chaudhry Farrukh Altaf. Chaudhary Muhammad Saqlain was offered provisional assembly seat PP-25 (Dina-Sohawa), he turned the offer down and contested the 2018 Pakistani general election from NA-66 (Jhelum-I) against Chaudhry Farrukh Altaf and NA-67 (Jhelum-II) against Fawad Chaudhry as an independent candidate.

In the 2018 Pakistani general election he stood fourth from NA-66 (Jhelum-I) obtaining 26,072 votes against Pakistan Tehreek-e-Insaf's candidate Chaudhry Farrukh Altaf. And in NA-67 (Jhelum-II) he obtained negligible votes.
