= Fawad Chaudhry =

Pakistani politician

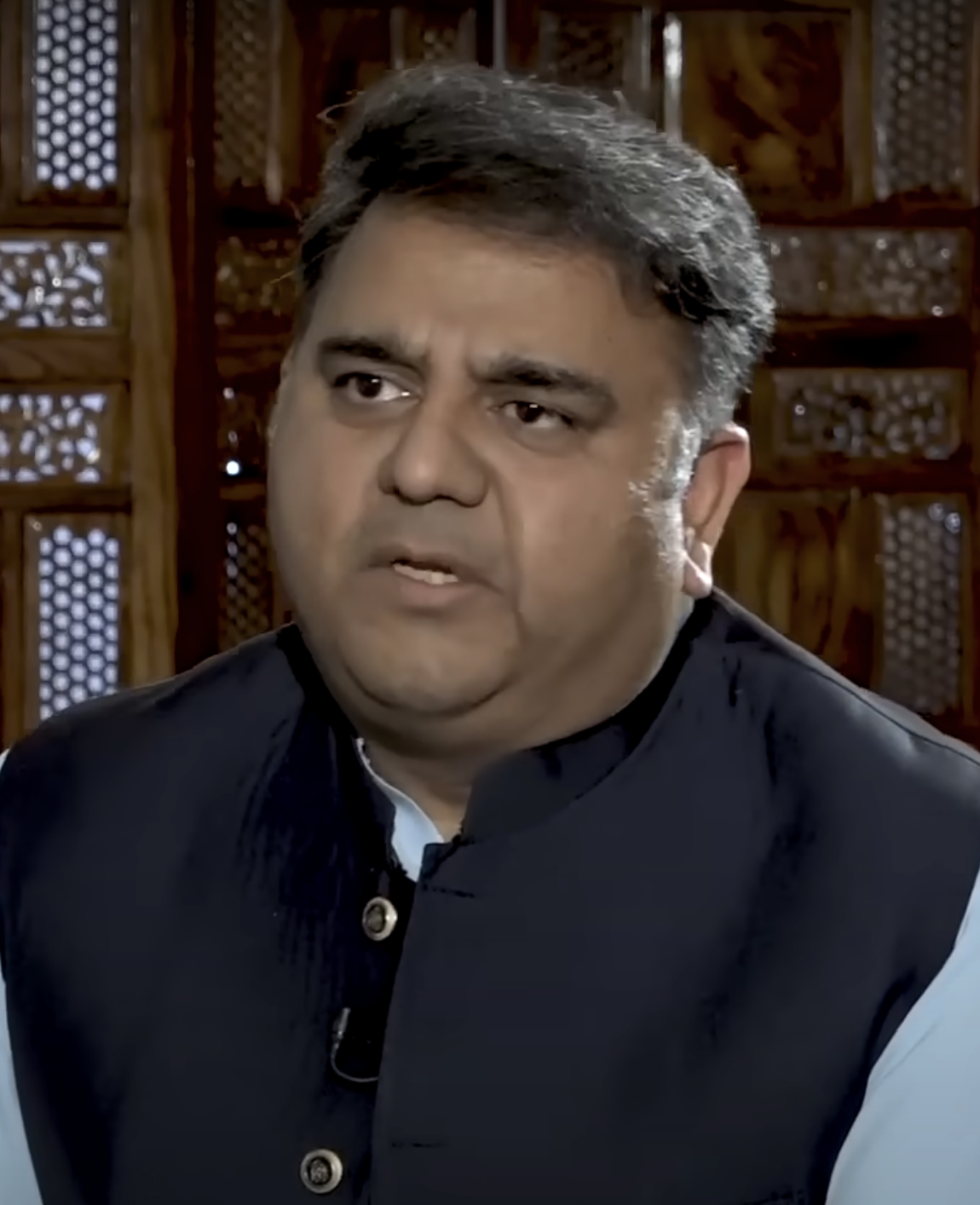

Minister for Information and Broadcasting
- In office 14 April 2021 – 10 April 2022
- Deputy: Farrukh Habib (State Minister)
- Preceded by: Shibli Faraz
- Succeeded by: Marriyum Aurangzeb
- In office 20 August 2018 – 18 April 2019
- President: Arif Alvi
- Prime Minister: Imran Khan
- Preceded by: Maryam Aurangzeb
- Succeeded by: Firdous Ashiq Awan as Special Assistant

Minister for Science and Technology
- In office 18 April 2019 – 14 April 2021
- President: Arif Alvi
- Prime Minister: Imran Khan
- Preceded by: Azam Swati
- Succeeded by: Shibli Faraz

Special Assistant to the Prime Minister for Information and Political Affairs
- In office April 2012 – April 2013
- President: Asif Ali Zardari
- Prime Minister: Yusuf Raza Gillani

Member of the National Assembly of Pakistan
- In office 13 August 2018 – 17 January 2023
- Preceded by: Nawabzada Raja Matloob Mehdi
- Constituency: NA-67 (Jhelum-II)
- Majority: 10,607

Personal details
- Born: Jhelum, Punjab, Pakistan
- Other political affiliations: PTI (2016–2023); Independent (2013-2016); PPP (2008-2013); PML(Q) (2001-2008)
- Relatives: Chaudhry Mohammad Awais (grandfather); Chaudhry Altaf Hussain (uncle); Chaudhry Iftikhar Hussain (uncle); Chaudhry Shahbaz Hussain (uncle); Chaudhry Farrukh Altaf (cousin)

Fawad Ahmed Hussain Chaudhry (Note: Urdu: فواداحمد حسین چوہدری) (born 7 April 1976) is a Pakistani politician who served as Federal Minister for Information and Broadcasting, in office since 14 April 2021 to 10 April 2022. On 24 May 2023, he announced his retirement from politics.

Previously, he held the office of federal minister for Science and Technology from 19 April 2019 to 16 April 2021. He had been a member of the National Assembly of Pakistan from August 2018 till January 2023. He was a member of Pakistan Tehreek-e-Insaf's core committee from 4 June 2019 till 24 May 2023.

Previously, he has also served in the federal cabinet of prime minister Yousaf Raza Gillani and prime minister Raja Pervaiz Ashraf as special assistant for Information and Political Affairs respectively, between April 2012 and March 2013.

== Early life ==
Fawad was born in Ladhar, a village near Dina in the Jhelum District of Punjab, where he still resides. He belongs to a politically active Punjabi Jat family of the Vains (also spelled Bains) clan, his uncle Chaudhry Altaf Hussain being appointed Governor of Punjab twice while another uncle Chaudhary Iftikhar Hussain has served as Chief Justice of Lahore High Court.

== Journalistic career ==
He is lawyer by profession and has worked as a political analyst and an anchor for five different media organizations. He hosted Khabar Kay Pechay on Neo News; in March 2015 he took an interview of Syed Mustafa Kamal and interrogated him about the supposed links between the political party MQM and RAW, India's intelligence agency.

== Political career ==
=== Early career in different parties ===
Fawad was covering candidate for the seat of the Provincial Assembly of the Punjab as an independent candidate from Constituency PP-25 (Jhelum-II) in the 2002 Pakistani general election. As a backup candidate, He supported candidate Chaudhry Tasneem Nasir, a candidate of Pakistan Muslim League (Q) (PML-Q) who received 38,626 votes.

Fawad joined former President Pervez Musharraf as his spokesperson in 2009, later he was appointed General Secy. of Pervez Musharraf APML Punjab Chapter. In January 2012, he resigned as media coordinator of All Pakistan Muslim League (APML). In March 2012, he quit APML and joined Pakistan Peoples Party (PPP). In April 2012, he was inducted into the federal cabinet of Prime Minister Yousaf Raza Gillani and was appointed special assistant to Prime Minister for information and political affairs with the status of a minister of state where he continued to serve until June 2012 when the federal cabinet was dissolved following the disqualification of Prime Minister Yousaf Raza Gillani. In July 2012, Raja Pervaiz Ashraf was elected Prime Minister and Chaudhry was re-inducted into the federal cabinet. He was appointed Special Assistant for Prime Minister on Political Affairs where he served until March 2013.

He ran for the seat of the National Assembly of Pakistan as a candidate of PML-Quaid from NA-63 (Jhelum-II) in the 2013 Pakistani general election but was unsuccessful. He received 34,072 votes and lost the seat to Malik Iqbal Mehdi Khan. In the same election, he also ran for the seat of the Provincial Assembly of the Punjab as a backup candidate from Constituency PP-24 (Jhelum-I) but was unsuccessful. He received only 82 votes and lost the seat to Raja Muhammad Awais Khan.

=== Pakistan Tehreek-e-Insaf (2016–2023) ===
==== Early electoral setbacks and party leadership appointments ====
In June 2016, he joined Pakistan Tehreek-e-Insaf (PTI).

He ran for the seat of the National Assembly as a candidate of PTI from Constituency Constituency NA-63 (Jhelum-II) in by-election held in August 2016 but was unsuccessful. He received 74,819 votes and lost the seat to Nawabzada Raja Matloob Mehdi.

In November 2016, he was appointed the spokesperson of PTI. In March 2018, he was given the additional charge of Secretary Information of PTI after the resignation of Mr. Shafqat Mahmood.

==== Electoral success ====
In June 2018, he was allocated PTI ticket to contest the 2018 Pakistani general election from Constituency NA-67 (Jhelum-II). An election tribunal rejected the nomination papers of Chaudhry after a petition was filed claiming Fawad had not paid agriculture tax. The Lahore High Court allowed Chaudhry to contest the election after he filed an appeal in high court against the election tribunal's decision.

He was elected to the National Assembly as a candidate of PTI from Constituency NA-67 (Jhelum-II) in 2018 general election. He received 93,102 votes and defeated Nawabzada Raja Matloob Mehdi, a candidate of Pakistan Muslim League (N) (PML-N). In the same election, he was also elected to the Provincial Assembly of the Punjab as a candidate of PTI from Constituency PP-27 (Jhelum-III). He received 67,003 votes and defeated Nasir Mehmood, a candidate of PML-N. Following his successful election, he expressed interest to become the Chief Ministers of Punjab in a TV talk show.

==== Ministerial career ====
On 18 August 2018, Imran Khan formally announced his federal cabinet structure and Chaudhry was named as Minister for Information and Broadcasting. On 20 August 2018, he was appointed Federal Minister for Information and Broadcasting in the federal cabinet of Prime Minister Imran Khan.

In April 2019, Prime Minister Imran Khan announced a major reshuffle of the federal cabinet and Chaudhry was removed as Federal Minister for Information and Broadcasting. He was subsequently appointed Federal Minister for Science and Technology.

In May 2019, as Minister for Science and Technology, Chaudhry launched Pakistan's first official moon-sighting website and issued a five-year lunar calendar based on scientific readings of the moon’s movement in a bid to end Pakistan's yearly moon-sighting controversy. During another controversy Fawad Chaudhry slapped Bol News anchor Mubashir Luqman.

In October 2020, Chaudhary said that Pakistan was responsible for the 2019 Pulwama attack, commenting that “Humne Hindustan Ko Ghus Ke Maara (We hit India in their home). Our success in Pulwama, is a success of this nation under the leadership of Imran Khan.”

==== Resignation from the National Assembly ====
On 10 April 2022, due to the removal of Imran Khan's government by vote of no confidence, he resigned from the National Assembly on the orders of Imran Khan. The newly elected Speaker accepted the resignations of eleven members on 28 July 2022, one of them was Fawad Chaudhry. After the 09/05 vandalism of Army installations, PTI members and leadership, were arrested en-masse.

==== 2023 arrest ====
On 24 January 2023, he was arrested on allegations of threatening senior members of Pakistan Election Commission and their families in order to desist from their duties according to Islamabad police. An FIR (No 69/23) was registered against the PTI leader under sections 153-A, 506, 505 and 124-A of PPC on the complaint of Secretary ECP Omar Hamid Khan, saying the accused used threatening language against the commission and its members. Speaking to the media and people, the accused, Fawad Chaudhry, threatened the ECP members and their families, the FIR stated. Fawad Chaudhry was released from Adiala jail on 1 February 2023 after he was granted bail on the condition that he would not repeat any such words that incite violence against a constitutional institution. The ECP and prosecution opposed Fawad’s bail and requested the court to reject it.

==== Leaving Pakistan Tehreek-e-Insaf ====
On 24 May 2023, Fawad Chaudhry decided to leave the Pakistan Tehreek-e-Insaf party. He publicly announced his retirement from "active politics" and parted ways with Imran Khan and Pakistan Tehreek-E-Insaf, resigning from both his held positions within the party and basic party membership.

== After politics ==
During the 2024 Indian general election, Chaudhry commented that “It is very important that Modi loses the elections. Every Pakistani wants him to lose,”, while extending “best wishes” to opposition leaders, including Rahul Gandhi, Arvind Kejriwal, and Mamata Banerjee, to defeat the Narendra Modi government. His comments triggered a stir and backlash from citizens of India, as Chaudhry stated that "BJP-RSS alliance in India is stoking hatred towards Pakistan, while Pakistan has no hatred towards India". In response to the tweet, Aam Aadmi Party chief and Delhi Chief Minister Arvind Kejriwal replied that "I and the people of my country are fully capable of handling our issues. Your tweet is not needed. The situation in Pakistan is very bad right now. You take care of your country." Kejriwal further added that "The elections taking place in India are our internal matter. India will not tolerate interference from the biggest sponsors of terrorism".

== Writings ==
Chaudhry has contributed opinion columns as a writer in both Urdu and English, including for Arab News.
