= Chaudhry Farrukh Altaf =

Pakistani politician

- چوہدری فرُخ الطاف

Member of the National Assembly of Pakistan
- Incumbent
- Assumed office 29 February 2024
- Constituency: NA-61 Jhelum-II
- In office 13 August 2018 – 10 August 2023
- Constituency: NA-66 (Jhelum-I)

Personal details
- Born: Dina, Punjab, Pakistan
- Party: IPP (2025-present)
- Other political affiliations: PMLN (2024-2025); IPP (2023-2024); PMLN (2022-2023); PTI (2018-2022); PMLN (2013-2018); PPP (2008-2013); PML(Q) (2001-2008); PMLN (1997-1999); PPP (1993-1996)
- Parent: Chaudhry Altaf Hussain (father)

Chaudhry Farrukh Altaf is a Politician who has been a member of the National Assembly of Pakistan since February 2024 and previously served in this position from August 2018 till August 2023.

== Political career ==
Chaudhry Farrukh Altaf contested on Pakistan Peoples Party's ticket in the 1997 Pakistani general election from NA-45 Jhelum-I (which was renamed later to NA-66 (Jhelum-I)). He obtained 32,097 votes and lost to Pakistan Muslim League (N)'s candidate Raja Muhammad Afzal Khan.

During Pervez Musharraf era in 2001, Chaudhry Farrukh Altaf was elected unopposed as District Nazim from District Jhelum on ticket of Pakistan Muslim League (Q).

In 2008, he supported Chaudhry Shahbaz Hussain from NA-66 (Jhelum-I) in the 2008 Pakistani general election.

In the 2013 Pakistani general election he contested from NA-66 (Jhelum-I) on Pakistan Muslim League (Q)'s ticket but lost the seat to Chaudhry Khadim Hussain who obtained 102022 votes. Farrukh obtained 36878 votes and stood third in the poll.

In 2016, Fawad Chaudhry cousin of Chaudhry Farrukh Altaf joined PTI, he pursued party leadership to give ticket of NA-66 (Jhelum-I) to his cousin Chaudhry Farrukh Altaf.

He was elected to the National Assembly of Pakistan as a candidate of Pakistan Tehreek-e-Insaf (PTI) from Constituency NA-66 (Jhelum-I) in the 2018 Pakistani general election. He received 112,356 votes and defeated Chaudhry Nadeem Khadim, a candidate of Pakistan Muslim League (N).

In April 2022, Farrukh Altaf crossed the floor and defected from Pakistan Tehreek-e-Insaf to join the opposition alliance Pakistan Democratic Movement ending in successful No-confidence motion against Imran Khan.
