= Chaudhry Altaf Hussain =

Pakistani politician (1929–1995)

25th and 27th Governor of Punjab
- In office 26 March 1994 – 21 May 1995
- President: Farooq Leghari
- Prime Minister: Benazir Bhutto
- Preceded by: Iqbal Khan
- Succeeded by: Raja Saroop Khan
- In office 25 April 1993 – 19 July 1993
- President: Ghulam Ishaq Khan
- Prime Minister: Balakh Sher Mazari; Nawaz Sharif
- Preceded by: Mian Muhammad Azhar
- Succeeded by: Iqbal Khan

Personal details
- Born: 18 May 1930 Dina, Punjab, British India
- Died: 21 May 1995 (aged 65) Lahore, Punjab, Pakistan
- Party: Pakistan Peoples Party
- Relations: Chaudhry Javaid Hussain (brother); Chaudhry Naseem Hussain (brother); Chaudhry Iftikhar Hussain (brother); Chaudhry Shahbaz Hussain (brother); Fawad Chaudhry (nephew)
- Children: Chaudhry Farrukh Altaf (son)
- Parent: Chaudhry Mohammad Awais (father)

Chaudhry Altaf Hussain (Punjabi and Urdu: چودھری الطاف حسین) was a Pakistani politician who served as the 19th Governor of Punjab, Pakistan in 1993 and again from 1994 and 1995. Previously, he had been member of the National Assembly of Pakistan from 1956 to 1958 and again from 1990 to 1993. He was then appointed as Governor of Punjab which he served for three years.

== Early life and family ==
He was born on 28 May 1930 in a political family of Jhelum District to former politician Chaudhry Mohammad Awais. He is the brother of former Chief Justice of Lahore High Court and former tehsil nazim chaudhry javaid hussain. His son Chaudhry Farrukh Altaf is currently serving as member of National Assembly of Pakistan.

== Political career ==
He was first elected to the National Assembly of Pakistan in 1956 which he served till 1958.

He participated in the 1970 Pakistani general election from his constituency but defeated.

In 1981, he joined the Muhammad Zia-ul-Haq Majlis-i-Shura and remained a member till 1985.

He again participated in the 1985 Pakistani general election as an independent candidate which he lost.

In 1990, he joined Pakistan Peoples Party (PPP). He once again participated in 1990 Pakistani general election as a candidate of Pakistan Peoples Party (PPP) and defeated Raja Mohammad Afzal of the Islami Jamhoori Ittehad (IJI).

In 1993, he was appointed Governor of Punjab, Pakistan where he served till July 1993. He was re-appointed in April 1994 where he remained in office till his death on 21 May 1995.

Political offices
Preceded by Mian Muhammad Azhar	Governor of Punjab; Apr 1993 – Jul 1993	Succeeded by Raja Saroop Khan
