= Chaudhry Iftikhar Hussain (judge) =

Pakistani jurist

Chaudhry Iftikhar Hussain (Urdu: چوہدری افتخار حسین; 1946 – 6 June 2015) was a Pakistani jurist who served as the 36th Chief Justice of Lahore High Court from 2002 to 2007.

== Early life and family ==
Hussain was born in 1946 in Dina, in Jhelum District. He received his early education from Lahore and Jhelum. He graduated in law from Punjab University Law College in 1970.

He belonged to an influential political family of Jhelum. His brother Chaudhry Altaf Hussain served as Governor of Punjab, Pakistan. Another brother, Chaudhry Shahbaz Hussain is a former federal minister. His nephew Fawad Chaudhry is currently a member of Pakistan Tehreek-e-Insaf and served as a former Minister of Science and Technology. He was relegated to this position from Ministry of Information & Broadcasting (Pakistan) which he headed for just six months before being replaced by Dr. Firdous Ashiq Awan.

== Career ==
He started his practice as a lawyer of Lahore High Court in 1979.

In 1994, he was appointed as the judge of Lahore High Court and was confirmed on confirmed 5 June 1995.

He took oath on Provisional Constitutional Order (PCO) and was appointed Chief Justice of Lahore High Court on 7 September 2002 by Pervaiz Musharraf where he served till 12 December 2007.
