= Raja Muhammad Afzal Khan =

Pakistani politician (1936–2020)

Raja Muhammad Afzal Khan (راجہ محمد افضل خان)

Member of the National Assembly of Pakistan

Personal details
- Born: 1 March 1936
- Died: 11 April 2020 (aged 84)
- Occupation: Politician

Raja Muhammad Afzal Khan (Urdu: راجہ محمد افضل خان; 1 March 1936 - 11 April 2020) was a Pakistani politician. He belongs to a Rajput family of the Janjua clan. He was elected to the National Assembly of Pakistan four times and Senate of Pakistan once. He was the member of Pakistan Peoples Party.

== Biography ==
In 1983, Raja Afzal started his political career by winning Jhelum Municipal Committee chairman election and later on from 1985 to 1999, he remained MNA and senator, mostly from the PML-N. In 2002, he could not contest the poll due to graduation bar and fielded his two sons Raja Asad and Raja Safdar as PML-N nominees on National Assembly seats of Jhelum and only Asad won but in 2008 his both sons won NA seats.

In 2012, he left the PML-N over differences on award of party ticket for a by-election. The vote was held after a provincial assembly seat fell vacant as Khadim Gharmala’s son Nadeem Khadim was held ineligible over dual nationality.

Although the senior politician had enjoyed a long association with the Sharif family and PML-N, they developed differences in late 2012. As a result, he along with his two sons had left the party and joined the PPP in January 2013.

Raja Afzal contested as a PPP nominee on two seats in the 2013 election but lost the poll. Later, he joined the PTI but he supported PML- N’s Raja Matloob Mehdi in the 2016 by-election against PTI’s Fawad Chaudhry. That was his last public political activity. He did not play any role in the July 2018 general election.

He died after a prolonged illness on 11 April 2020.
