= Potha =

Potha may refer to:

- Potha, Jhelum, a village in Jhelum district, Pakistan
- Potha, Mansehra, a village in Mansehra district, Pakistan
