= Janjua =

Punjabi Rajput Clan in South Asia

- Jāti: Rajput
- Religions: Islam, Hinduism
- Languages: Punjabi
- Country: Pakistan, India
- Region: Punjab
- Ethnicity: Punjabi
- Feudal title: Malik, Raja

The Janjua or Janjhua is a Punjabi Rajput clan found predominantly in the Pothohar Plateau of Pakistani Punjab, but also in the states of Punjab and Haryana in India.

== History ==
The Janjuas had historically engaged in a long-running struggle for sovereignty over the Salt Range.

The history of this region (the Salt Range) from the thirteenth century onward had been a sickening record of wars between Janjua and Gakhars for political ascendancy.

=== Mughal period ===
One of earliest mention to the Janjuas was by Babur, who wrote in his Baburnama that Koh-i-Jud (Salt Range) was inhabited by two tribes descending from a common ancestor, Janjuha and Jud (probably Jodhra). Later, the Pashtun king Sher Shah Suri constructed the Rohtas Fort in Punjab to check Humayun's entry into Hindustan, and also to keep a check on the local tribes including Gakhars as well as Janjuas.

=== Sikh period ===
The expansion of the Sikh Empire, spearheaded by Ranjit Singh, was met with resistance by the Janjua chief of Watli, Sultan Fateh Muhammad Khan. A six-month siege of Kusuk Fort in Watli followed and only ended when the inhabitants ran short of water. The fortunes of Kala Khan branch of Rawalpindi Janjuas were also eclipsed by the rise of the Sikh Empire. The Janjua rebellion against the Sikh Empire was a political rebellion, as the Janjua were initially keen allies to the Sukerchakia Misl.

=== British period ===
By the time the British Raj took an interest in conquering the Sikhs in 1848–49, they were joined by tribes such as the Janjuas and Gakhars who had lost control of their centuries-old ancestral kingdoms to the imperial Sikh Empire and sought revenge. Tan Tai Yong says that "Besides being impressed with their track record, the British saw in them, with their traditional and historical enmity against the Sikhs, an effective counterpoise against the latter."

During the nineteenth century, they were listed as a martial race. During this period, due to their high aristocratic status, the Janjuas refused to serve in any regiment that was not commanded by either a Janjua or another commander of equal social standing. This preference was honoured by the British when selecting regiments for them.

== Notable people ==
- Adam Azim, British Pakistani boxer
- Altaf Gauhar, intellectual and writer close to Pakistan's military dictator Ayub Khan
- Brigadier Amir Gulistan Janjua, Pakistan Army officer, Governor of the North-West Frontier Province, Ambassador of Pakistan to Nepal, Saudi Arabia and the United Arab Emirates
- Amir Khan, British-Pakistani boxer, his paternal grandfather Lal Khan Janjua was in the Pakistan Army
- Amna Nawaz, Pakistani-American broadcast journalist and a co-anchor of the PBS NewsHour, her uncle was Asif Nawaz Janjua
- Asif Nawaz Janjua, Chief of Army Staff of the Pakistan Army from 1991 till his death in 1993
- Hamzah Sheeraz, British Pakistani boxer
- Major General Iftikhar Khan Janjua, Pakistan Army officer killed in action in the Battle of Chumb
- Labh Janjua, Indian bhangra vocalist and songwriter
- M. K. Janjua, most senior officer of the Royal Pakistan Air Force from 1947 to 1951
- Muhammad Hussain Janjua, Pakistan Army soldier who fought in the Zafarwal Sector of the 1971 Indo-Pakistani War, destroyed 16 Indian tanks on a reconnaissance mission and was posthumously awarded Nishan-e-Haider
- Raja Iqbal Mehdi Khan, politician he was provincial minister of Punjab province and elected multiple times as the Member of the National Assembly of Pakistan from Pind Dadan Khan
- Raja Muhammad Afzal Khan, Senator, he was elected more than multiple times as Member of the National Assembly of Pakistan from Jhelum
- Saif Ali Janjua, a Lance Naik Platoon Commander in the 1947 Indo-Pakistani War who inflicted heavy losses on the enemy and repulsed ventures on his post, posthumously awarded Nishan-e-Haider
- Shah Nawaz Khan, Indian politician who served as a General in the Indian National Army (INA) during World War II
- Tehmina Janjua, Foreign Secretary of Pakistan, 2017 to 2019
- Tikka Khan, Pakistan Army general who served as the military Governor of East Pakistan during the Bangladesh Liberation War in 1971 and later became the first Chief of Army staff from 1972 to 1976
- Zafar Ali Khan, Islamic scholar
- Lieutenant General Zaheer-ul-Islam, former Director-General of Inter-Services Intelligence
