= Bilal Azhar Kayani =

Member of the National Assembly of Pakistan from Jhelum (2024–2029)

- بلال اظہر کیانی
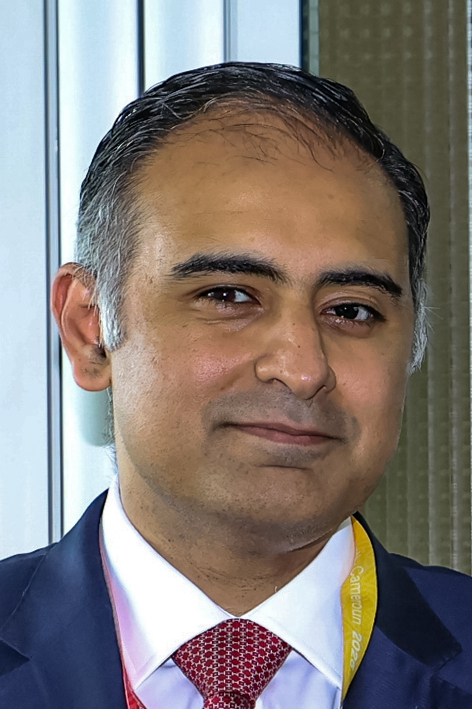
- Kayani in 2026

Member of the National Assembly of Pakistan
- Incumbent
- Assumed office 29 February 2024
- Constituency: NA-60 Jhelum-I

Personal details
- Born: Dina, Punjab, Pakistan
- Party: PMLN (2024-present)

Bilal Azhar Kayani (Urdu: بلال اظہر کیانی) is a Pakistani politician who has been a member of the National Assembly of Pakistan since February 2024.

== Early life and career ==
Bilal Azhar Kayani is the son of Major General Azhar Mahmood Kayani. He holds a degree in Economics from University College London. Kayani won the 2024 Pakistani general election from NA-60 Jhelum-I as a Pakistan Muslim League (N) candidate. He received 99,948 votes while runners up Independent Supported (PTI) Pakistan Tehreek-e-Insaf, candidate Hassan Adeel received 90,474 votes.
