= NA-60 Jhelum-I =

Constituency of the National Assembly of Pakistan

- Constituency for the National Assembly of Pakistan
- Region: Sohawa Tehsil, Dina Tehsil (partly) and Jhelum Tehsil (partly) Jhelum District
- Electorate: 538,897

Current constituency
- Created: 2018
- Party: Pakistan Muslim League (N)
- Member: Bilal Azhar Kayani
- Created from: NA-62 (Jhelum-I)

NA-60 Jhelum-I (این اے-60، جہلم-١) is a constituency for the National Assembly of Pakistan.

== Members of Parliament ==
=== 1970–1977: NW-32 Jhelum-I ===
Election	Member	Party
1970	Ghulam Hussain	PPP

=== 1977–1988: NA-44 Jhelum-I ===
Election	Member	Party
1977	Ghulam Hussain	PPP
1985	Raja Muhammad Afzal Khan	Independent

=== 1988–2002: NA-45 Jhelum-I ===
Election	Member	Party
1988	Raja Muhammad Afzal Khan	IJI
1990	Chaudhry Muhammad Altaf Hussain	PDA
1993	Raja Muhammad Afzal Khan	PML-N
1997	Raja Muhammad Afzal Khan	PML-N

=== 2002–2018: NA-62 Jhelum-I ===
Election	Member	Party
2002	Chaudhry Shahbaz Hussain	PML-Q
2008	Raja Muhammad Safdar Khan	PML-N
2013	Chaudhry Khadim Hussain	PML-N

=== 2018–2023: NA-66 Jhelum-I ===
Election	Member	Party
2018	Chaudhry Farrukh Altaf	PTI

=== 2024–present: NA-60 Jhelum-I ===
Election	Member	Party
2024	Bilal Azhar Kayani	PML(N)

== Election 2002 ==
General elections were held on 10 October 2002. Chaudhry Shahbaz Hussain of PML-Q won by 75,217 votes.

General election 2002: NA-62 Jhelum-I
Party	Candidate	Votes	%	±%
PML(Q)	Ch. Shahbaz Hussain	75,217	50.80	
PML(N)	Raja Muhammad Safdar	51,618	34.87	
PPP	Sohail Zafar	15,133	10.22	
MMA	Raja Muhammad Zia Ashraf	4,391	2.97	
Others	Others (two candidates)	1,694	1.14	
Turnout		150,881	52.01	
Total valid votes		148,053	98.13	
Rejected ballots		2,828	1.87	
Majority		23,599	15.93	
Registered electors		290,079		

== Election 2008 ==
The result of general election 2008 in this constituency is given below.

=== Result ===
Raja Muhammad Safdar succeeded in the election 2008 and became the member of National Assembly.

General election 2008: NA-62 Jhelum-I
Party	Candidate	Votes	%	±%
PML(N)	Raja Muhammad Safdar	92,479	51.31	
PML(Q)	Ch. Shahbaz Hussain	61,524	34.13	
PPP	Ch. Sohail Zafar	20,080	11.14	
Others	Others (two candidates)	6,159	3.39	
Turnout		186,376	50.36	
Total valid votes		180,242	96.71	
Rejected ballots		6,134	3.29	
Majority		30,955	17.18	
Registered electors		370,090		
PML(N) gain from PML(Q)				

== Election 2013 ==
General elections were held on 11 May 2013. Chaudhry Khadim Hussain of PML-N won by 102,230 votes and became the member of National Assembly.

General election 2013: NA-62 Jhelum-I
Party	Candidate	Votes	%	±%
PML(N)	Chaudhry Khadim Hussain	102,230	47.37	
PTI	Chaudhary Muhammad Saqlain	62,880	29.13	
PML(Q)	Chaudhry Farrukh Altaf	36,842	17.07	
Others	Others (ten candidates)	13,878	6.43	
Turnout		222,410	57.11	
Total valid votes		215,830	97.04	
Rejected ballots		6,580	2.96	
Majority		39,350	18.24	
Registered electors		389,451		
PML(N) hold				

== Election 2018 ==
General elections were held on 25 July 2018.

General election 2018: NA-66 Jhelum-I
Party	Candidate	Votes	%	±%
PTI	Chaudhry Farrukh Altaf	112,356	39.96	
PML(N)	Chaudhary Nadeem Khadim	92,912	33.05	
TLP	Khalid Tanveer	29,556	10.51	
Independent	Ch Muhammad Saqlain	26,072	9.27	
Others	Others (five candidates)	8,750	3.12	
Turnout		281,159	51.94	
Rejected ballots		11,513	4.09	
Majority		19,444	6.91	
Registered electors		541,296		
PTI gain from PML(N)				

== Election 2024 ==
General elections were held on 8 February 2024. Bilal Azhar Kayani won the election with 99,973 votes.

General election 2024: NA-60 Jhelum-I
Party	Candidate	Votes	%	±%
PML(N)	Bilal Azhar Kayani	99,973	43.09	▲10.04
PTI	Hassan Adeel (Note: Filed nomination papers as PTI candidate but ECP allowed him to run as an Independent)	90,579	39.04	▼0.92
Independent	Zahid Akhtar	24,296	10.47	N/A
Others	Others (fifteen candidates)	17,155	7.39	
Turnout		237,717	44.11	▼7.83
Total valid votes		232,003	97.60	
Rejected ballots		5,714	2.40	
Majority		9,394	4.05	
Registered electors		538,897		
PML(N) gain from PTI				

== See also ==
- NA-59 Chakwal-cum-Talagang
- NA-61 Jhelum-II
