= Raja Muhammad Safdar Khan =

Pakistani politician

Member of the National Assembly of Pakistan
- In office 2008–2013
- Constituency: NA-62 (Jhelum-I)

Raja Muhammad Safdar Khan is a Pakistani politician. He belongs to a Rajput family of the Janjua clan. He has been a member of the National Assembly of Pakistan from 2008 to 2013.

He is brother of Raja Muhammad Asad Khan.

== Political career ==
He ran for the seat of the National Assembly of Pakistan from Constituency NA-62 (Jhelum-I) as a candidate of Pakistan Muslim League (N) (PML-N) in the 2002 Pakistani general election but was unsuccessful. He received 51,618 votes and lost the seat to Chaudhry Shahbaz Hussain, a candidate of Pakistan Muslim League (Q) (PML-Q).

He was elected to the National Assembly from Constituency NA-62 (Jhelum-I) as a candidate of PML-N in the 2008 Pakistani general election. He received 92,479 votes and defeated Chaudhary Shahbaz Hussain, a candidate of PML-Q.

In 2013, he quit PML-N and joined Pakistan Peoples Party (PPP).
