= Dhok Padhal =

Coordinates: 32°58′N 73°31′E

Dhok padhal (ڈھوک پڈھال )
- Village
- Interactive map of Dhok padhal (ڈھوک پڈھال )
- Country: Pakistan
- Province: Punjab
- District: Jhelum District
- Tehsil: Dina
- Union council: Khukha

Government
  - NAIB CHAIRMAN: MUHAMMAD IKHTYAR HUSSAIN

Population (2010)
  - Total: 1,200
- Time zone: UTC+5 (PST)

Dhok Padhal (Urdu: ڈھوک پڈھال) is a village in Jhelum District, Punjab, Pakistan. This village was named in 1667 after a shepherd and in Punjabi language sheep are called (phad) so people use to call it a "village of Phads" so from there the name was derived as "Dhok Padhal". This village is the based on Jutt tribes.

== Geography ==
The village is located at 32° 58' 40" North, 73° 30' 40" East and has an altitude of 275 metres (905 ft) Falling Rain Genomics and has an area of about 1,000 acres (4.0 km^{2}). Lies 10 km west of Dina, 5 km north of Rohtas and 30 km north east of Tilla Jogian.

== Castes ==
The principal castes are Kasmirirs, Jutts Taarkhan
