= Mota Gharbi =

Village in Punjab, Pakistan

Mota Gharbi موٹیاں Motiyaan
- Village
- Interactive map of Mota Gharbi
- Coordinates: 32.986944°N 73.524444°E
- Country: Pakistan پاكِستان
- Province: Punjab
- Region: Potohar Plateau سطح مرتفع پوٹھوہار
- District: Jhelum District جِہلم
- Tehsil: Dina دِینہ

Population
  - Total: 1,771
- Time zone: UTC+5 (PST)
- Postal Code: 49380
- Area code: 0544
- Website: https://motagharbi.com

Mota Gharbi (Urdu: موٹا غربی) is a village in Dina Tehsil in District Jhelum in Punjab, Pakistan.

== Geography ==
Mota Gharbi is a village in the Dina Tehsil of District Jhelum, Punjab, Pakistan. It is located 11.3 kilometers (7.0 miles) from Dina. The village is divided into three mahallahs: Bhurla Mahalla, Apprla Mahalla, and Sehno Na Khoh Mahalla. Nearby settlements include Dhok Gujral and Dhok Padhal. Mota Gharbi also has several historic graveyards.

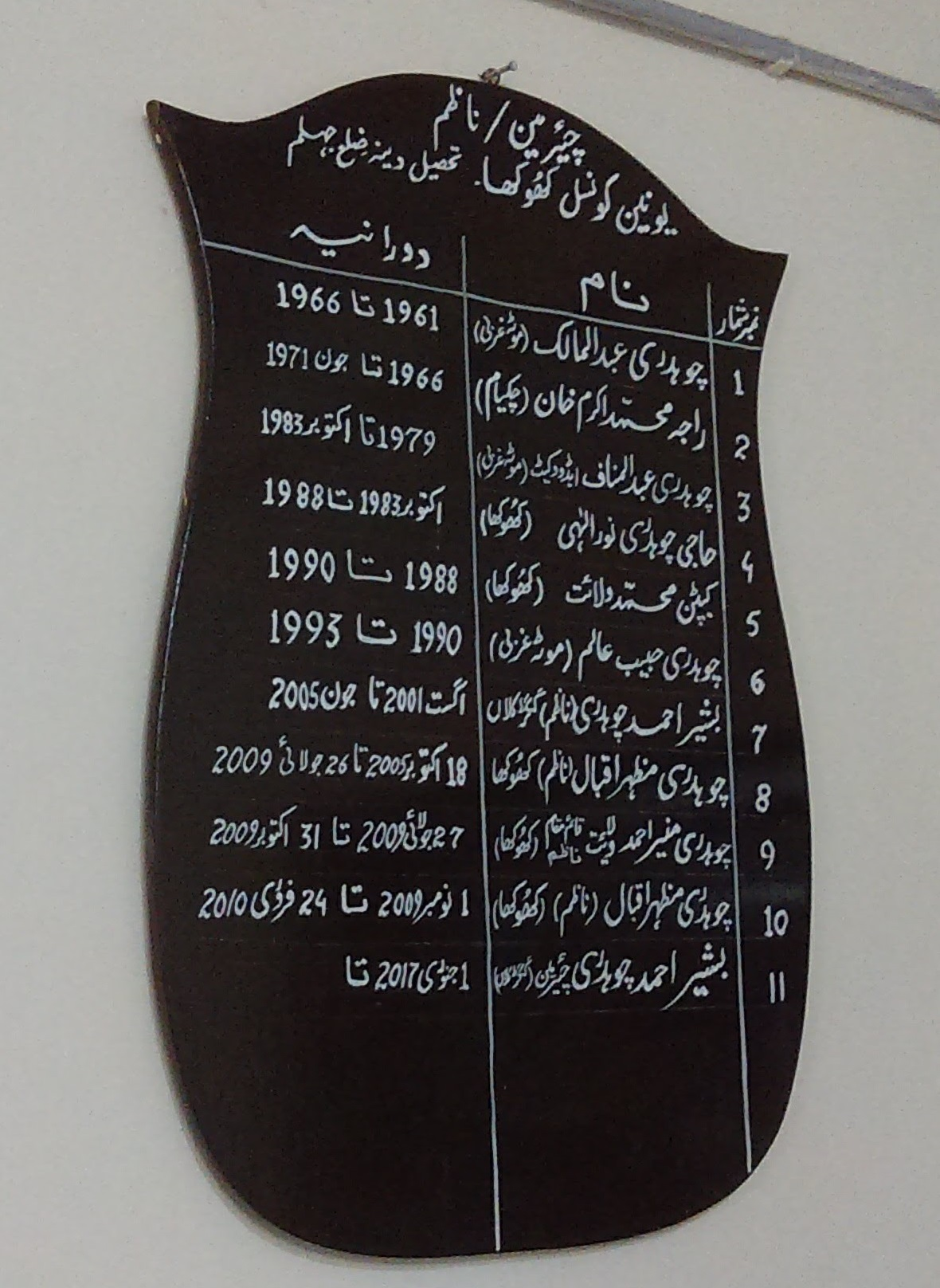
Union council Khukha councillors list

== Demographics ==
The village has a population of 1,771 in 293 households, according to the Government of Punjab.

== Transport ==
Three roads lead to Mota Gharbi village. The first road passes through Rohtas Fort from Dina Tehsil. The second road branches off GT Road near the Dina police station and goes through Khukha. The third road also begins at GT Road, at the main Choke (Mangla), heads toward the railway station, and then turns right at Bahg (Baghan), passing through Guggar Kalan.

The first road was originally constructed in the 1980s, by the efforts of Gen M Aslam Mirza. It was reconstructed following decay in the 2000s, and was built once again in 2020.

== Historical places ==
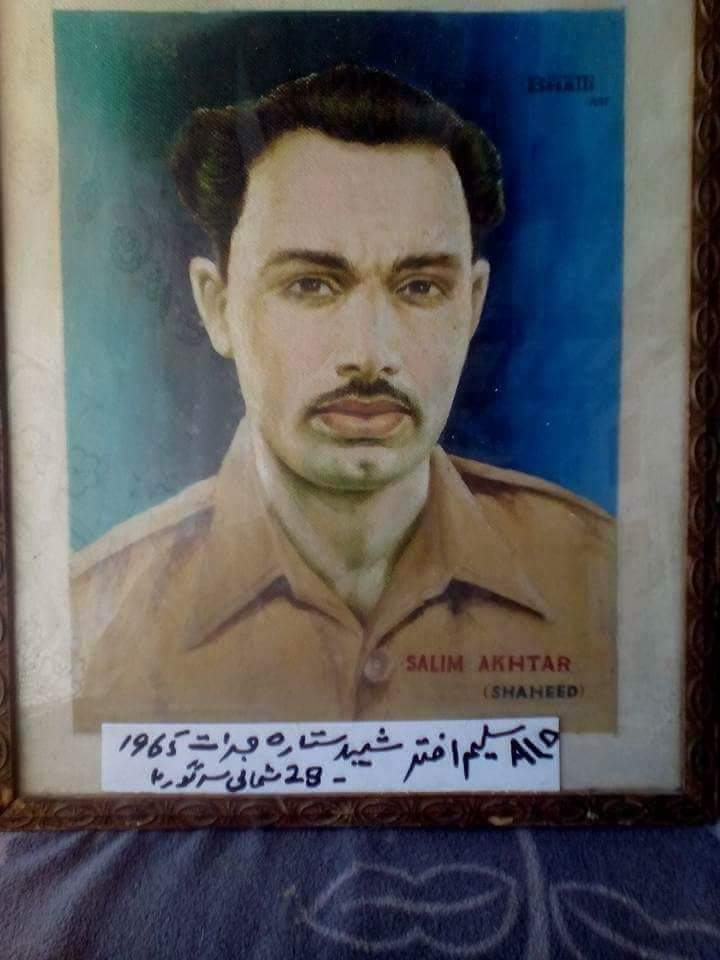
Saleem: War Hero of 1965 Indo-Pakistani War

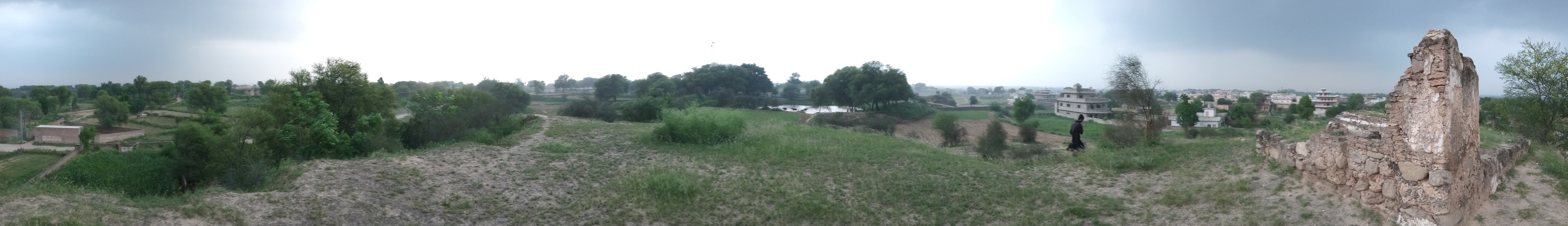
Jheera Old Tomb of Unknown Person

Mota Gharbi has historical sites such as the Jheera Tomb and the old Qabristan near Kassi. Jheera has fallen into disrepair.

== Welfare association ==
The Mota Gharbi Welfare Association (MGWA) is an organization in the village that oversees various community projects, such as cleaning and repairing streets, planting trees, and assisting people in need. The organization has contributed to road cleaning, drain coverage, and other initiatives. Additionally, the association has installed street lights powered by solar energy.

The motto of MGWA is "Mota Gharbi Green and Clean."

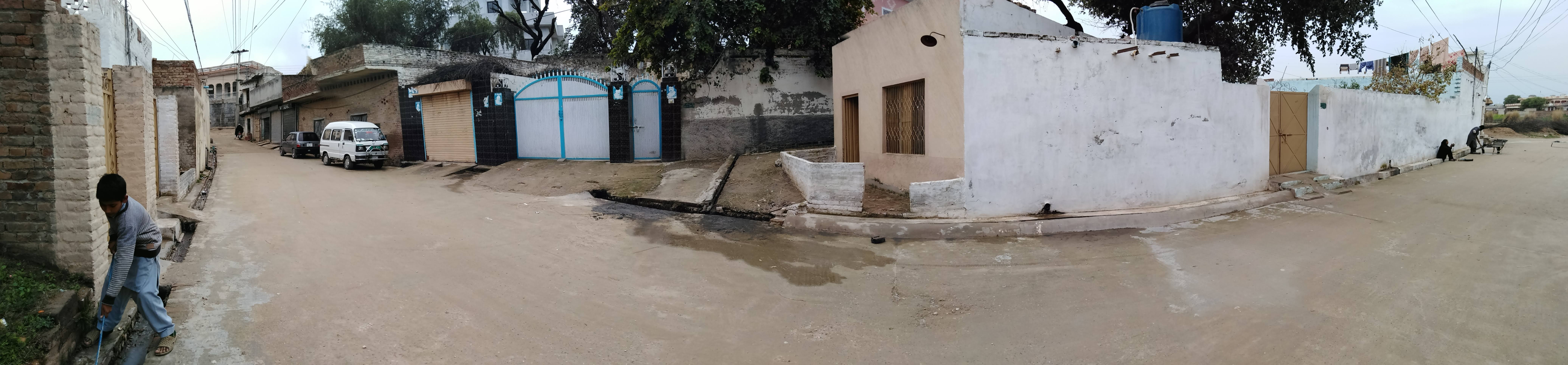

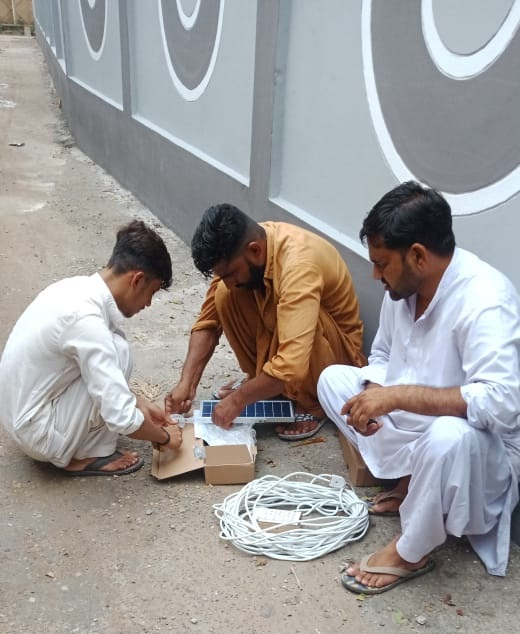
Work Force during installing solar lights

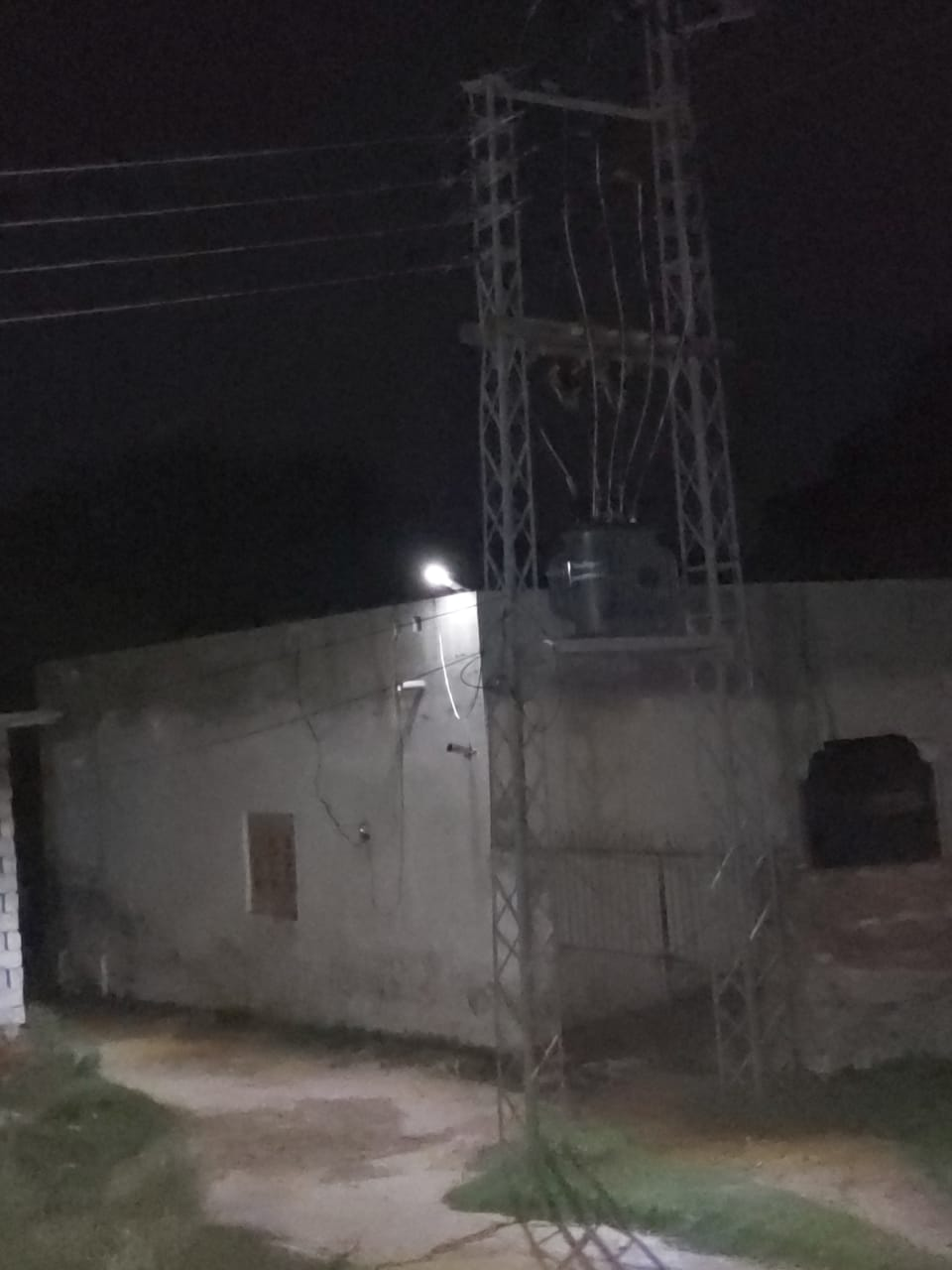
A Street Light (Solar Street Light) installed by MGWA.

== Mosques ==
- Jamia Masjid Mota Gharbi
- Masjid Hafiz Sahib
- Masjid Noor-al-Islaam
- Masjid Jahandaad
- Masjid Ali
- Masjid Boys High School

== Education ==
=== Government High School Mota Gharbi for Boys ===
Govt High School Mota Gharbi is located in Jhelum District.It was started by the Efforts of Gen M Aslam Mirza. 356 students, 16 teachers, and 12 classrooms make up the school.

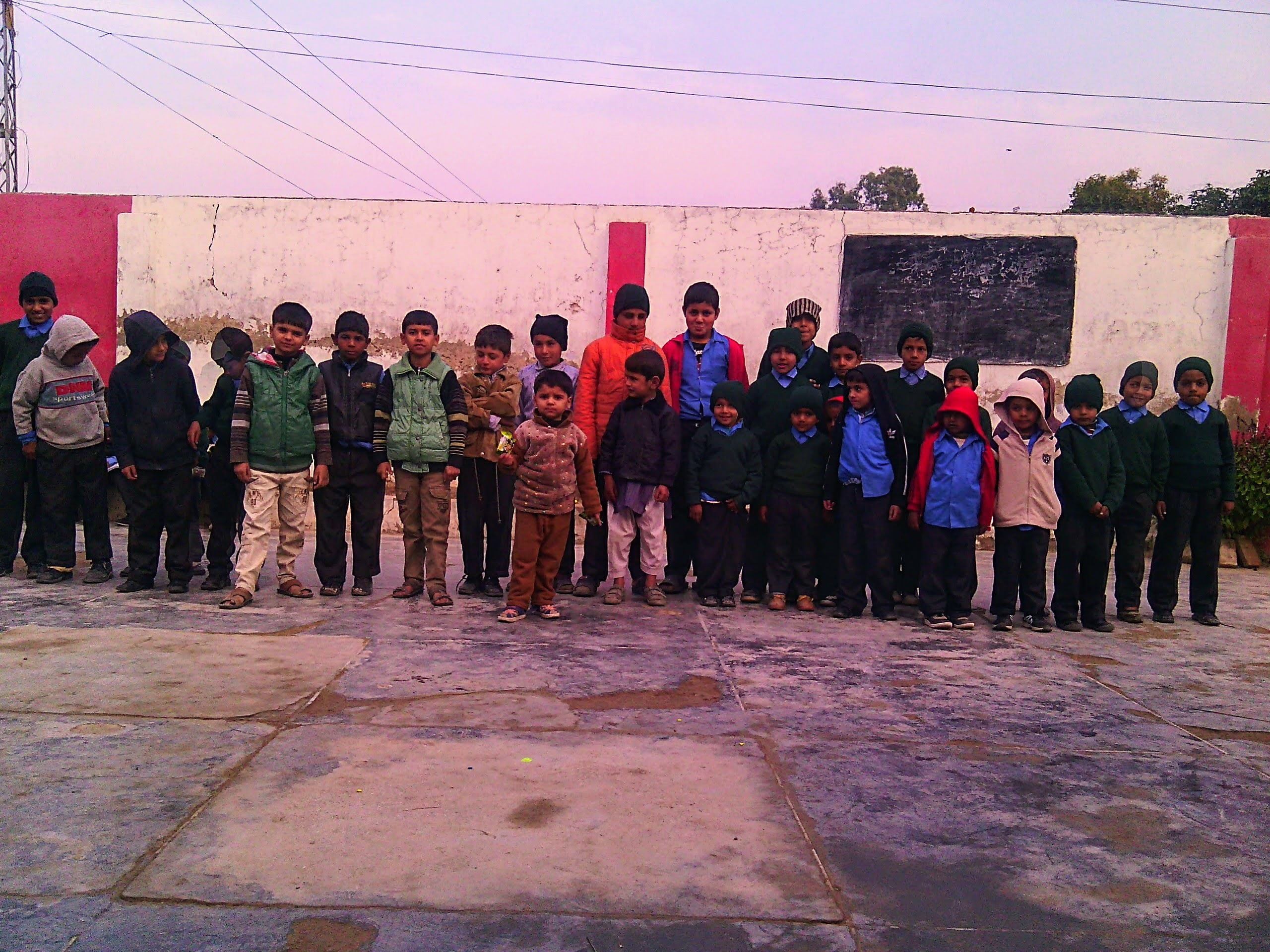
Mota Gharbi Primary Schools boys

=== Dar-e-Arqam School Mota Gharbi ===
The Dar-e-Arqam school was the second private school in Mota Gharbi, built after the Alam Academy.

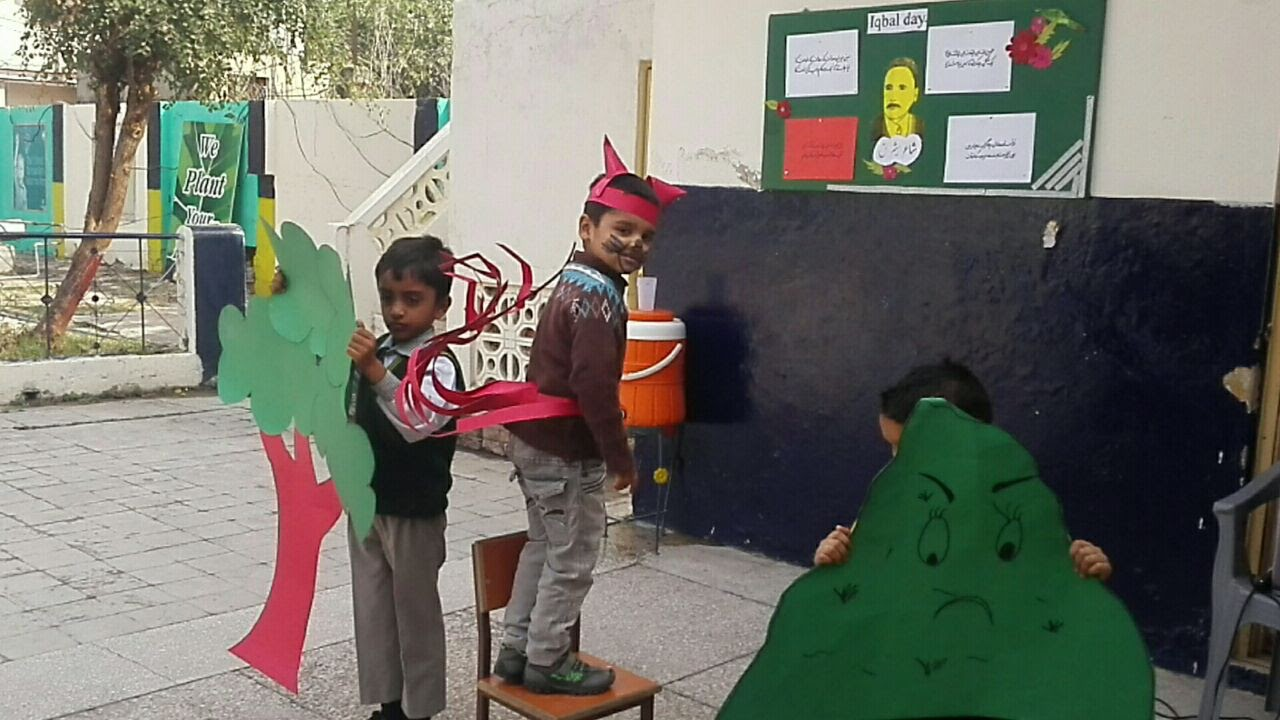
Dar-e-Arqam schoolboys in a tablo

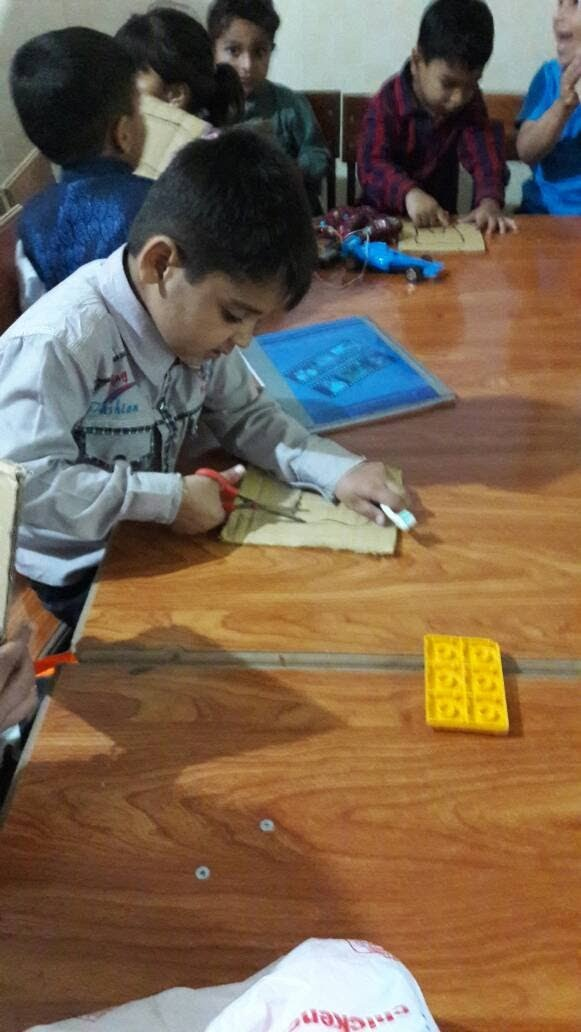
Dar-e-Arqam school Activity Work Class

=== Alam Academy Mota Gharbi ===
The Alam academy was the first private school in Mota Gharbi, founded by Sir Haroon Alam Butt.

== Health care ==
=== Basic Health Unit of Mota Gharbi ===
The Basic Health Unit is a hospital in Mota Gharbi that provides healthcare to the village, Gagar, Dhook Padhal, Bodla, Kotyaam, and Gujral residents.

=== Apps Mota Gharbi Medical Dispensary ===
The Apps Mota Gharbi Medical Dispensary provides medical services to residents of the village and nearby locations. It also serves as a field dispensary.It was started by Dr Col Taimur Mirza

== Dams ==
A dam was built in Mota Gharbi to store rainwater. Dam repair work has been done by the Mota Gharbi Welfare Association. According to the government, the dam is in a state of disrepair.

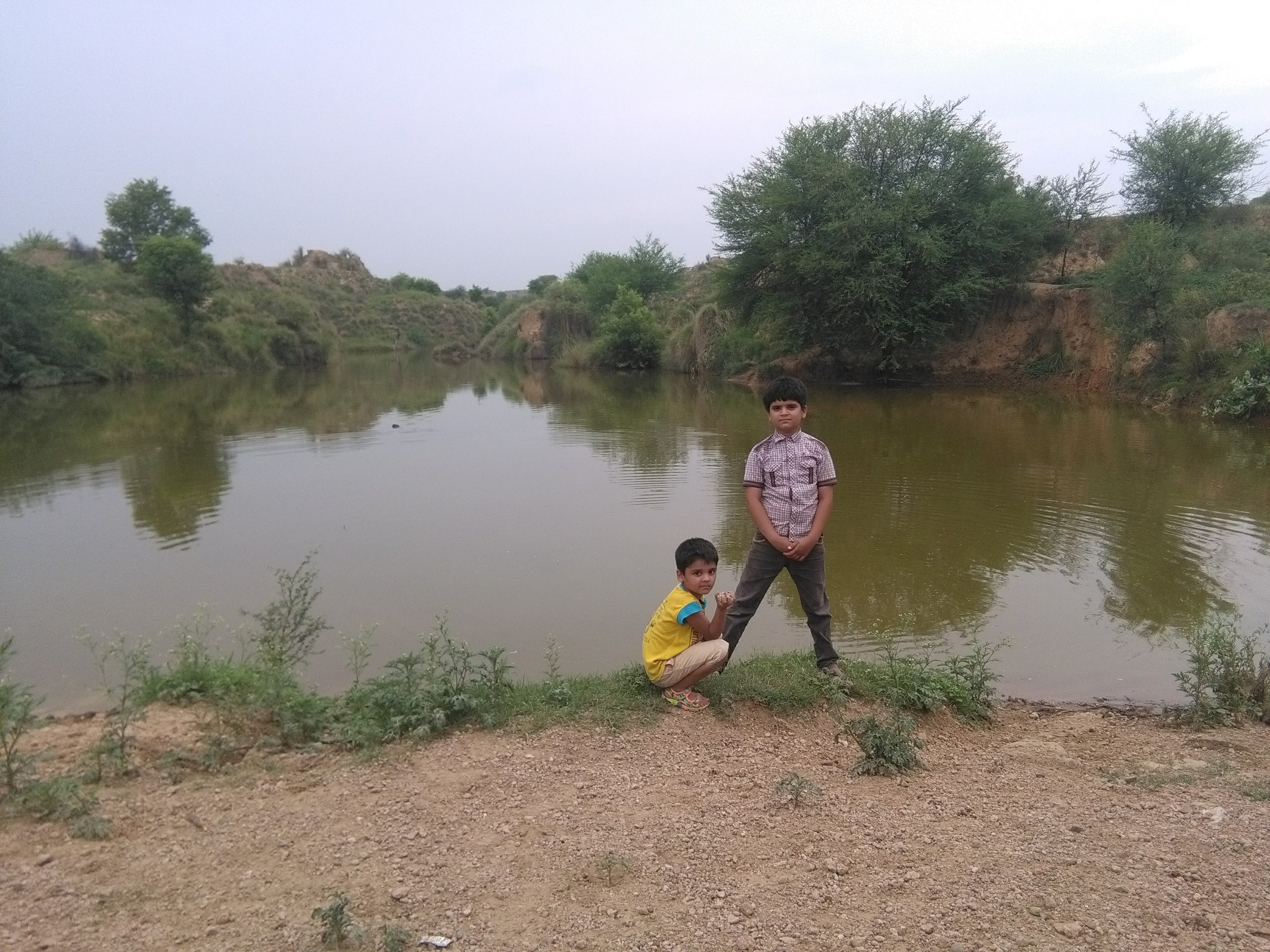
Mota Gharbi Dam to Store Rainwater

== Graveyards ==
Several historic qabristans (graveyards) are present in Mota Gharbi. The qabristan in use now has graves more than a hundred years old. The planting of trees in the Qabristan started by Mr. Ismail Butt and the surrounding barbed wire was also laid with his efforts to increase the number of trees. Later, due to construction of the wall around the cemetery was further improved. From the beginning, people used to plant trees in the cemetery on their own, but after the establishment of the Mota Gharbi Welfare Association, the cleaning of the cemetery and growing new plants became systematic. A few individuals, lacking an understanding of the importance of trees, often look for opportunities to cut and sell them under the pretext of a shortage of funds.
