= Muftian =

Pakistani village

Coordinates: 33°01′N 73°50′E

Muftian (Urdu: مفتیاں) is a village situated in Tehsil Dina, Jhelum District, Punjab, Pakistan.

Muftian is located close to the Grand Trunk Road, and around the historic Rohtas Road, which is the long used route to the famous Rohtas Fort. Muftian is a farming village. It borders Dina and is historically well known for the shrine of Kwaja Maqbool. It has been visited over many years by people from Punjab and also Kashmir.

== History ==
Little is documented about the origins of this village. It is believed to have been named after a famous Islamic jurist and scholar Jalal-ud-din known as "Mufti Sahib" who (as traditions cite) was relied upon for a technical religious verdict in the time of the latter Mughal emperors. A prominent shrine to "Mufti sahib" has been built within the "old graveyard" bordering Muftian and Dina, running parallel to Rohtas Road. "Mufti sahib" was also known as "Baba Mufti". Kwaja Maqbool whose shrine is now the central point for visitors in Muftian, was a student of the jurist and Islamic scholar "Mufti Sahib". The end of the 19th century saw the development of Muftian with notable contributions from Mian Muhammad Mahram Haidari Chishti and Mian Muhammad Baqa Haidari Chishti in the organisation and setup of a dedicated teaching for the memorisation of the Qur'an.

It was through the instructions of the famous Chishti Spiritual Leader Khwaja Shams-ud-Din Sialvi that this requirement of Muftian Village was recognised, and both Mian Muhammad Mahram Haidari Chishti and Mian Muhammad Baqa Haidari Chishti were appointed to commence this work under the patronage of their Spiritual Leader Pir Syed Ghulam Haidar Ali Shah of Jalalpur Sharif. Following this many individuals and families from Muftian and surrounding areas, pledged spiritual allegiance to Pir Syed Ghulam Haidar Ali Shah of Jalalpur Sharif and subsequently to their descendants. Notable efforts were made by the locals of these areas in assisting the Amir-e-Hizbullah Pir Syed Muhammad Fazal Shah in supporting the cause for an independent Islamic Republic (Pakistan), for which strenuous efforts were made from 1927, which is the year Hizbullah ("Party of God") was formed by Pir Syed Muhammad Fazal Shah. These efforts continued through to the creation of the Islamic Republic of Pakistan in August 1947.

Different castes and working communities have lived in Muftian for many generations, and have worked together for the development and prosperity of the village. These include Bhatti Rajputs, Gujjars (Mufti, Kasana, Mian), Jatt (Gondal), Awan (Qutab Shahi), Baloch, Malik, Kashmiri (Butt, Dar).

== Notable sites ==
- Shrine of "Jalal-ud-din" or "Baba Mufti"
- Shrine of Kwaja Maqbool
- Markazi Jamia Masjid Mosque of Muftian
- Jamia Masjid Noori Muftian
- Markazi Janazaghah (Central Public Gathering and Funeral Ground) Muftian Village
- Noor Abdullah Public School Muftian Dina
- Mini Mart Muftian
