= Pind Jata =

Coordinates: 33°03′N 73°35′E

Pind Jata (Urdu: پنڈ جاٹا, romanized: pinḍ jāṭā) is a village situated near the outskirts of the town of Dina in the district of Jhelum in the Pakistani province of Punjab. The word pind means "village" in the Punjabi language, and jata refers to the Jatt tribe which is prominent in the area where Pind Jata is situated, so Pind Jata might be a compound word meaning "village of the Jatts".

== Media ==
Video of traditional Horse dance in the village https://www.youtube.com/watch?v=HU587qC9P_Y

Location of Pind Jata on a map http://www.tageo.com/index-e-pk-v-04-d-m3847947.htm
