= Nawabzada Raja Matloob Mehdi =

Pakistani politician

- نوابزادہ راجہ مطلوب مہدی

Member of the National Assembly of Pakistan
- In office 8 September 2016 – 31 May 2018
- Constituency: NA-63 (Jhelum-II)

Personal details
- Party: Pakistan Muslim League (N)
- Relatives: Malik Iqbal Mehdi Khan (father)

Nawabzada Raja Matloob Mehdi (Urdu: نوابزادہ راجہ مطلوب مہدی) is a Pakistani politician who had been a member of the National Assembly of Pakistan, from September 2016 to May 2018. He belongs to a Rajput family of the Janjua clan.

== Political career ==
He began his political career by becoming chairman of Darapur Union Council in 2015.

He was elected to the National Assembly of Pakistan as a candidate of Pakistan Muslim League (N) from Constituency NA-63 (Jhelum-II) in by election held in August 2016. He received 82,896 votes and defeated Fawad Chaudhry, a candidate of Pakistan Tehreek-e-Insaf. Nawab family has deep roots in local politics. They have been elected for different assemblies since 1920. They have deep connections with Janjua Rajas, Awans, Maliks of whole constituency. Kadyal of Tobah are considered as the oldest and solid supporters of this family. The seat became vacant after his father Malik Iqbal Mehdi Khan died.
