= Kusak Fort =

Fort in Punjab, Pakistan

- کسک قلعہ
- Part of Fortifications of Chakwal District

Site information
- Type: Hill fort
- Owner: Mehwish Azmat Hayat family
- Controlled by: Janjua dynasty (historical)
- Open to the public: Yes
- Condition: Ruins

Location
- Coordinates: 32°42′33″N 73°03′56″E

Site history
- Built: 11th century
- Built by: Raja Jodh Janjua (son of Raja Mall Khan Janjua)
- Materials: Red sandstone and local soil
- Events: Attack by Jalal-ud-Din Khilji (13th c.); Siege by Ranjit Singh (1810)

Kusak Fort (Urdu: کسک قلعہ) is an ancient fort located in Chakwal District, Punjab, Pakistan.

== History ==
Kusak Fort was founded and constructed during the 11th century, under the reign of Raja Jodh who was a son of Raja Mall Khan Janjua, the founder of Malot Fort. It was built on a 13 acres of land located near Jodh Mountain, a mountain which is named after Jodh dynasty, using red stone and local soil. A palace for the reigning king was also established near the fort along with around seventy houses for its small army.

In the 13th century, the fort faced an attack from Jalal-ud Din Khilji and his army.

In 1810, Ranjit Singh attacked the area with his army that forced Sultan Fateh Muhammad and his family to leave the fort. Later, the Janjua family migrated to Haranpur.

== Ownership ==
Kusak Fort is owned by Mehwish Azmat Hayat family.
