= Potha, Jhelum =

Coordinates: 32°52′0″N 73°24′0″E

Potha is a village near Tilla Jogian, Jhelum District, Punjab, Pakistan. It is located at 32°52'0N 73°24'0E at an altitude of 408 metres (1341 feet).
