= Natain =

Village in Pakistan

Coordinates: 32°59′53″N 73°32′2″E

- Village
- Interactive map of Natain
- Country: Pakistan
- Province: Punjab
- District: Jhelum
- Tehsil: Dina
- Union council: Khukha

Population (2020)
  - Total: 700
- Time zone: UTC+5 (PST)

Natain is a village in Dina Tehsil of Jhelum District in the province of Punjab, Pakistan. It is about 8.5 km from the town of Dina and 25 km from Jhelum city. Natain is one of many villages surrounding Dina town. The village is located at 32°59'53"N and 73°32'2"E, at an altitude of 275 metres (905 ft).
