= Raja Muhammad Asad Khan =

Pakistani politician

Member of the National Assembly of Pakistan
- In office 2002–2013
- Constituency: NA-63 (Jhelum-II)

Personal details
- Born: 29 May 1975 (age 51)

Raja Muhammad Asad Khan (Urdu: راجا محمد أسد خان; born 29 May 1975) is a Pakistani politician who had been a member of the National Assembly of Pakistan from 2002 to 2013.

He is brother of Raja Muhammad Safdar Khan.

== Early life ==
He was born on 29 May 1975. He belongs to a Rajput family of the Janjua clan.

== Political career ==
He was elected to the National Assembly of Pakistan from Constituency NA-63 (Jhelum-II) as a candidate of Pakistan Muslim League (N) (PML-N) in the 2002 Pakistani general election. He received 46,722 votes and defeated Nawabzada Syed Shams Haider.

He was elected to the National Assembly from Constituency NA-63 (Jhelum-II) as a candidate of PML-N in the 2008 Pakistani general election. He received 79,662 votes and defeated Chaudhry Shahbaz Hussain, a candidate of Pakistan Muslim League (Q) (PML-Q).

In 2013, he quit PML-N and joined Pakistan Peoples Party (PPP).
