= NA-61 Jhelum-II =

Constituency of the National Assembly of Pakistan

- Constituency for the National Assembly of Pakistan
- Region: Pind Dadan Khan Tehsil, Dina Tehsil (partly) and Jhelum Tehsil (partly) including Jhelum city Jhelum District
- Electorate: 517,583

Current constituency
- Party: Pakistan Muslim League (N)
- Member: Chaudhry Farrukh Altaf
- Created from: NA-63 Jhelum-II

NA-61 Jhelum-II (این اے-61، جہلم-٢) is a constituency for the National Assembly of Pakistan.

== Members of Parliament ==
=== 1970–1977: NW-33 Jhelum-II ===
Election	Member	Party
1970	Mohammad Amir Khan	PPP
1974 by-election	Nazar Hussain Kiyani	PPP

=== 1970–1977: NW-34 Jhelum-III ===
Election	Member	Party
1970	Malik Muhammad Sadiq	PPP

=== 1977–1988: NA-45 Jhelum-II ===
Election	Member	Party
1977	Sardar Khizar Hayat Khan	PPP
1985	Malik Abdul Majeed	Independent

=== 1977–1988: NA-46 Jhelum-III ===
Election	Member	Party
1977	Masood-ul-Hassan Bhatti	PPP
1985	Raja Muhammad Afsar	Independent

=== 1988–2002: NA-46 Jhelum-II ===
Election	Member	Party
1988	Iqbal Mehdi	IJI
1990	Iqbal Mehdi	IJI
1993	Iqbal Mehdi	PML-N
1997	Iqbal Mehdi	PML-N

=== 2002–2018: NA-63 Jhelum-II ===
Election	Member	Party
2002	Raja Muhammad Asad Khan	PML-N
2008	Raja Muhammad Asad Khan	PML-N
2013	Iqbal Mehdi	PML-N
2016	Nawabzada Raja Matloob Mehdi	PML-N

=== 2018–2023: NA-67 Jhelum-II ===
Election	Member	Party
2018	Fawad Chaudhry	PTI

=== 2024–present: NA-61 Jhelum-II ===
Election	Member	Party
2024	Chaudhry Farrukh Altaf	PML(N)

== Election 2002 ==
General elections were held on 10 October 2002. Raja Muhammad Asad Khan of PML-N won by 46,722 votes.

General election 2002: NA-63 Jhelum-II
Party	Candidate	Votes	%	±%
PML(N)	Raja Muhammad Asad Khan	46,722	32.71	
PML(Q)	Nawabzada Syed Shamas Haider	39,933	27.96	
PPP	Saeed-Ul- Hassan Zaidi	26,353	18.45	
PPP(SB)	Dr. Ghulam Hussain	11,569	8.10	
PAT	Anwar Khan Afridi	6,587	4.61	
MMA	Raja Muhammad Nawaz Kayani	4,286	3.00	
Others	Others (five candidates)	7,368	5.17	.
Turnout		147,407	50.09	
Total valid votes		142,818	96.89	
Rejected ballots		4,589	3.11	
Majority		6,789	4.75	
Registered electors		294,278		

== Election 2008 ==
The result of general election 2008 in this constituency is given below.

=== Result ===
Raja Muhammad Asad Khan succeeded in the election 2008 and became the member of National Assembly.

General election 2008: NA-63 Jhelum-II
Party	Candidate	Votes	%	±%
PML(N)	Raja Muhammad Asad Khan	79,662	50.11	
PML(Q)	Ch. Shahbaz Hussain	51,666	32.50	
PPP	Ali-Uz-Zaman	24,476	15.40	
Independent	Mahmood Hussain Azad	3,181	1.99	
Turnout		163,014	43.06	
Total valid votes		158,985	97.53	
Rejected ballots		4,029	2.47	
Majority		27,996	17.61	
Registered electors		378,616		
PML(N) hold				

== Election 2013 ==
General elections were held on 11 May 2013. Nawabzada Raja Iqbal Mehdi Khan of PML-N won by 116,013 votes and became the member of National Assembly.

General election 2013: NA-63 Jhelum-II
Party	Candidate	Votes	%	±%
PML(N)	Malik Iqbal Mehdi Khan	116,013	57.01	
PTI	Mirza Saeed Mehmood Baig	42,805	21.04	
PML(Q)	Fawad Ahmad	34,072	16.85	
Others	Others (ten candidates)	10,591	5.10	
Turnout		208,754	53.95	
Total valid votes		203,481	97.47	
Rejected ballots		5,273	2.53	
Majority		73,208	35.97	
Registered electors		386,957		
PML(N) hold				

== By-election 2016 ==
By-election were held on 31 Aug 2016. Nawabzada Raja Matloob Mehdi of PML-N won by 81,612 votes and became the member of National Assembly.

== Election 2018 ==
General elections were held on 25 July 2018.

General election 2018: NA-67 Jhelum-II
Party	Candidate	Votes	%	±%
PTI	Fawad Chaudhry	93,102	44.40	
PML(N)	Raja Matloob Mehdi	82,475	39.34	
Others	Others (thirteen candidates)	29,685	14.16	
Turnout		209,671	51.87	
Rejected ballots		4,409	2.10	
Majority		10,607	5.06	
Registered electors		404,212		
PTI gain from PML(N)				

== Election 2024 ==
General elections were held on 8 February 2024. Chaudhry Farrukh Altaf won the election with 88,100 votes.

General election 2024: NA-61 Jhelum-II
Party	Candidate	Votes	%	±%
PML(N)	Chaudhry Farrukh Altaf	88,100	37.24	▼2.10
PTI	Shaukat Iqbal Mirza (Note: Filed nomination papers as PTI candidate but ECP allowed him to run as an Independent)	84,636	35.78	▼8.62
TLP	Imran Haider	28,238	11.94	▲3.93
PPP	Syed Amir Hamza Peerzada	13,294	5.62	N/A
Independent	Mushtaq Ahmed	10,294	4.35	▲3.84
Others	Others (eight candidates)	12,003	5.07	
Turnout		246,224	47.57	▼4.30
Total valid votes		236,565	96.08	
Rejected ballots		9,659	3.92	
Majority		3,464	1.46	
Registered electors		517,583		
PML(N) gain from PTI				

== See also ==
- NA-60 Jhelum-I
- NA-62 Gujrat-I
