= Raja Muhammad Awais Khan =

Pakistani politician

Member of the Provincial Assembly of the Punjab
- In office 29 May 2013 – 31 May 2018

Personal details
- Born: 9 March 1973 (age 53) Jhelum
- Party: Pakistan Muslim League (Nawaz)

Raja Muhammad Awais Khan is a Pakistani politician who was a Member of the Provincial Assembly of the Punjab, from May 2013 to May 2018.

== Early life and education ==
He was born on 9 March 1973 in Jhelum.

He has a degree of Bachelor of Arts which he received from University of the Punjab.

== Political career ==
He was elected to the Provincial Assembly of the Punjab as a candidate of Pakistan Muslim League (Nawaz) from Constituency PP-24 (Jhelum-I) in the 2013 Pakistani general election.

In December 2013, he was appointed as Parliamentary Secretary for Zakat and ushr.
