= Mehwish Sultana =

Pakistani politician

Member of the Provincial Assembly of the Punjab
- In office 29 May 2013 – 31 May 2018
- Constituency: Reserved seat for women

Personal details
- Born: 30 August 1980 (age 46) Chakwal, Punjab, Pakistan
- Party: PMLN (2013-present)

Mehwish Sultana (Urdu: مہوش سلطانہ; born 30 August 1980) is a Pakistani politician who was a Member of the Provincial Assembly of the Punjab, from May 2013 to May 2018. After that, Mehwish Sultana was elected as a Member of the Provincial Assembly of the Punjab on a reserved seat from August 2018 to January 2023, and has been performing her duties as a Member of the Provincial Assembly of the Punjab on a reserved seat again since February 2024 to date formed as a result of the Pakistan's general elections on February 8, 2024.

== Early life and education ==
Sultana was born on 30 August 1980 in Chakwal. She belongs to a Rajput family of the Janjua clan. Her family is one of the big landowners of the area. Apart from politics, her reason for fame is her family background, which is of historical importance. The Kasak Fort, located in village Watli of Tehsil Choa Saiden Shah, is still owned by her family. The Kasak Fort is attributed to the six-month long battle between her ancestors Sultan Fateh Muhammad Khan and Maharaja Ranjit Singh, which is known as a historical heritage as well as evidence of the sovereignty of her ancestors in this area in the past. Sultana's father, Sultan Raja Azmat Hayat, served as a Member of the Punjab Assembly from 1993 to 1996 and 1997 to 1999. Her grandfather, Raja Kher Mehdi, served as Member of the Legislative Assembly during 1946-47, 1951–55 and 1956-58. Sultana's mother, Ghazala Farhat, was a Member of the Punjab Assembly from 2008 to 2009. Now, her younger brother, barrister Sultan Azam-ul-Amar, has also stepped forward with her in regional and national politics under her guidance.

Sultana earned the degree of Master of Business Administration in Information Technology 2003 from Pir Mehr Ali Shah Arid Agriculture University and later completed a one-year Diploma in French Language from the National University of Modern Languages (NUML), Islamabad in 2005.

== Political career ==
She was elected to the Provincial Assembly of the Punjab as a candidate of the Pakistan Muslim League (N) (PML-N) in a reserved seat for women in the 2013 Pakistani general election.

In December 2013, she was appointed Parliamentary Secretary for higher education.

She was re-elected to the Provincial Assembly of the Punjab as a candidate of the PML-N in a reserved seat for women in the 2018 Pakistani general election. Subsequently, in the Pakistani general election of February 8, 2024, Mehwish Sultana was re-elected as a Member of the Provincial Assembly of the Punjab on a reserved seat for women and is serving in this position to date.
