= Potha, Mansehra =

Coordinates: 34°18′00″N 73°12′00″E

Potha is a small village in Mansehra District of Khyber-Pakhtunkhwa province of Pakistan. It is located at 34°17'60N 73°12'0E and lies near to the city of Mansehra, the district capital. also this is the nearest village to the city of Mansehra. It has an altitude of 1113 metres (3654 feet) and is an arid or barani (rain fed) area, with about 85% of the people involved in the agriculture sector.
