= Kadyal =

Village in Pakistan

Kadial (کدیال) is a local clan of Tobah, Jhelum which is situated in province of Punjab in Pakistan. The word "Kadial" is derived from Qadar Khan who came in village Tobah during 1850s from central India. It was time of wars and bloodshed in Sub-Continent as Sikh and East India Company were fighting for supremacy of Punjab and Mughal Empire was becoming paralyzed with each passing day.

Tobah was a rural area centered between Salt Range and Jhelum River, Thus providing security and lodging to Qadar Khan. Now population of this clan has exceeded 500. They are famous for being honest, punctual, temperamental, egoist and straightforward. Chaudhry Fateh Muhammad Kadyal (Late) who was also uncle of Lt. Col Muhammad Ali (Late) served as first Chairman of Tobah Union Council in 1960s.
