= Khukha =

Village in Jhelum District, Punjab, Pakistan

- Town and union council
- Interactive map of Khukha
- Coordinates: 33°0′0″N 73°33′0″E
- Country: Pakistan
- Province: Punjab
- District: Jhelum
- Tehsil: Dina
- Elevation: 259 m (850 ft)

Population (2017)
  - Urban: 4,000
- Time zone: UTC+5 (PST)

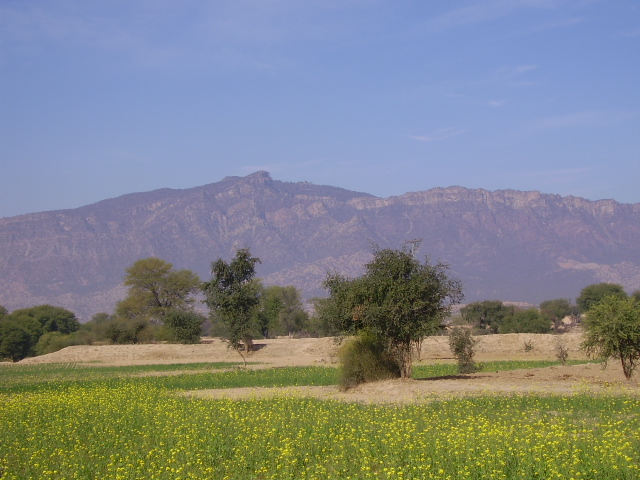
Tilla Jogian

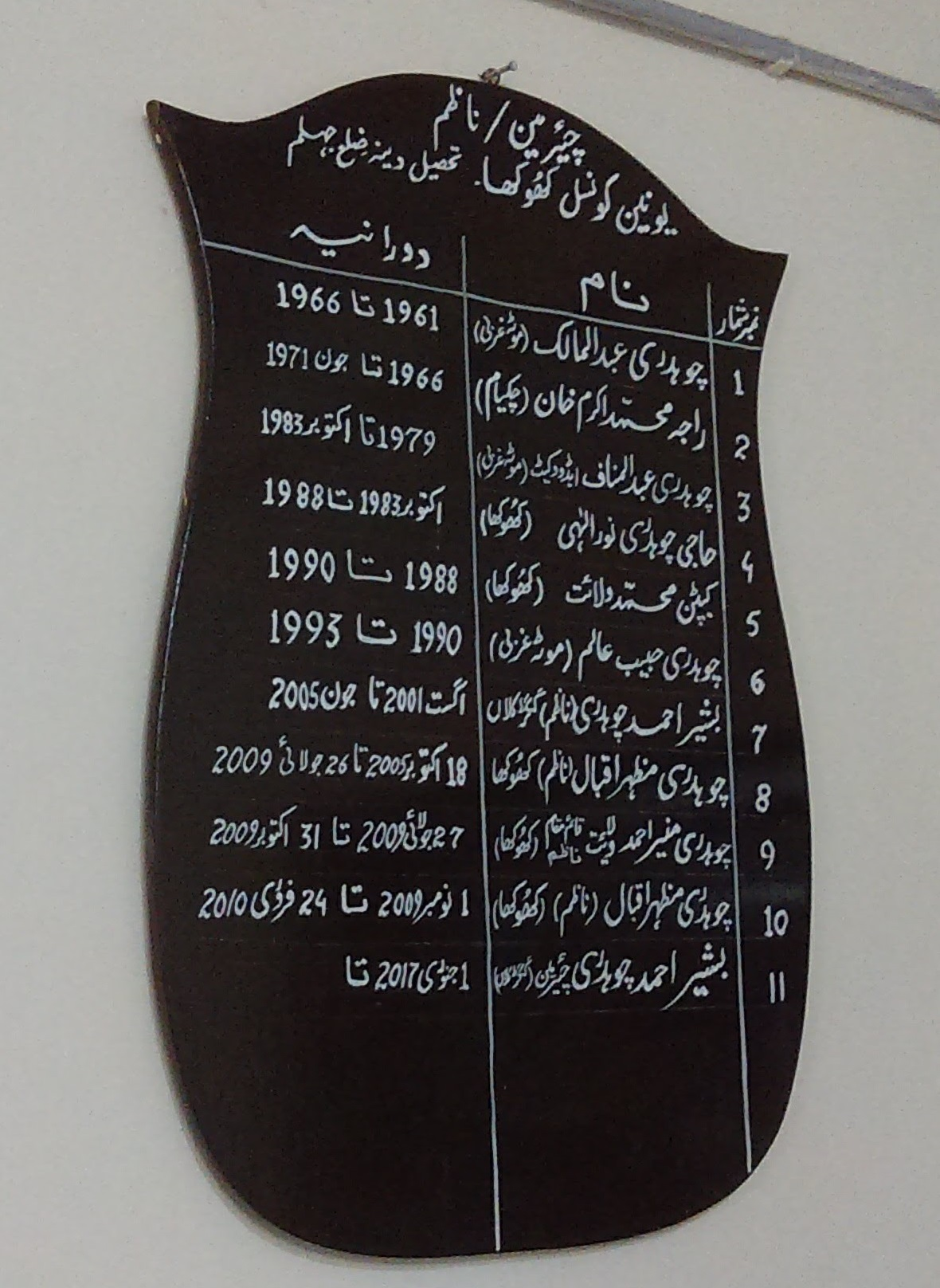
Union council khukha councillors list

Khukha is a village in Jhelum District, Punjab, Pakistan. It is a union council (administrative subdivision) of Jhelum Tehsil and a "model" village. It lies 7 km west of Dina, 1 km east of Gaggar Khurd, 5 km north of Rohtas and 10 km northeast of Tilla Jogian. Neighbouring villages include Natain, Khojki and Mota Gharbi.

The historical Grand Trunk Road (before the British made the tarmac road) runs from north to south on the west side of the village leading to Rohtas and then onto Jhelum. There is a Bavali (deep water well) made by the Mughals on this route about 1 km northwest of the village. There is now a new water supply which uses a new bore-hole (located near Baba Sher Shah's darbar) from where water is pumped to the new water tank (located near the Jamia Masjid) and water is supplied to almost the entire village.
