= Jogi (caste) =

Hindu community found in North India

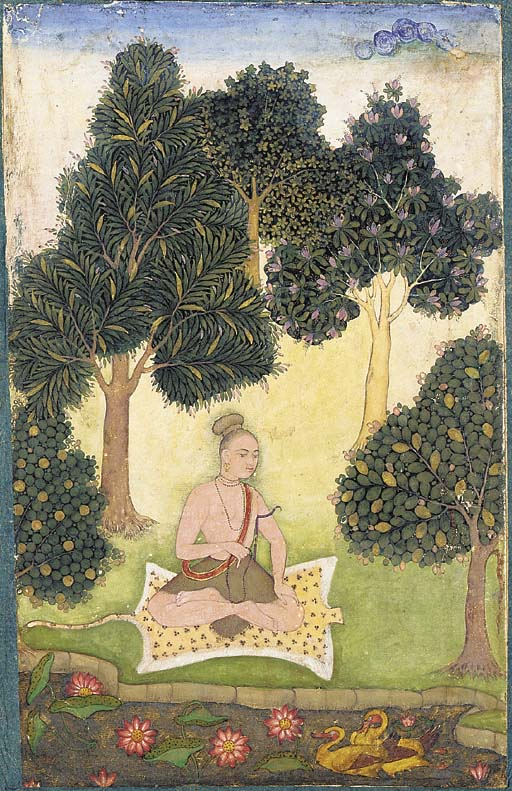
A yogi seated in a garden, North Indian or Deccani miniature painting, c.1620-40

The Jogi (also spelled Jugi or Yogi) is a Hindu community found in North India. Jogi surname is associated with the ancient migrants of the southern Indian states Karnataka, Andhra Pradesh, Tamil Nadu, Kerala and Gujarat.

The word 'Jogi' is derived from the Sanskrit word "yoga", and there is a description of caste and its origin mentioned in Shiva Purana.

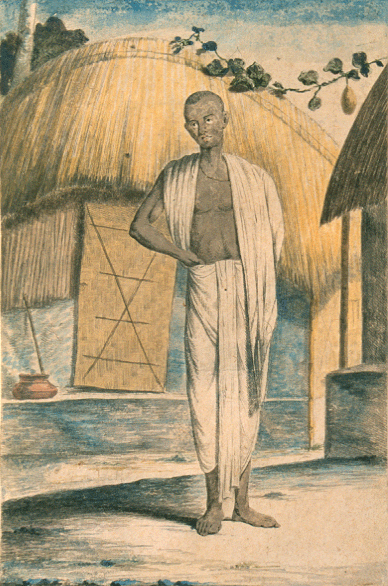
Jugi weaver of Bengal, from a 1799 book

== History ==
The four varna (castes) are perceived to be located in the nature of the individual, i.e. Brahmana in sadacara (righteous conduct), Ksatriya in saurya (valor and courage), Vaisya in vyavasaya (business), and Sudra in seva (service). A yogin experiences all men and women of all races and castes within himself. Therefore he has no hatred for anybody. He has love for every being.

— Gorakhnath, Siddha Siddhanta Paddhati III.6-8 (Translator: D Shastri)

They are Hindu by religion and have been claimed to have sacred thread on their body. They have been claimed to be descendants of the mendicants of India called Jogi as Sadhus and rishi.

== Classification ==
Jogis are classified as Other Backward Classes in most of India's States and Union territories, namely Assam, Rajasthan, Delhi, Uttarakhand, Uttar Pradesh, West Bengal, Madhya Pradesh and Scheduled Caste in the state of Himachal Pradesh.

Officially recognized names	Regions with OBC status	Designation	Notes
Jogi, Jogi vadi, Raval, Jati or Ravalyogi Jagariya	Gujarat^{10}	12011/68/93-BCC (C ) 10 September 1993	
Yogi, Jogi, Jugi Nath	Assam^{26}	12011/68/93-BCC(C) 10/09/1993	
Jogi (Jugi)	Bihar^{44}	12011/68/93-BCC(C) 10 September 1993	
Jogi, Nath	Chandigarh^{30}	12011/99/94-BCC 11 December 1997	
Nath, Yogi, Jogi	Daman and Diu^{16}	12011/9/94-BCC 19 October 1994	
Jogi, Goswami, Nath, Yogi, Gosain	Delhi^{25}	12011/7/95-BCC 24 May 1995	
Nathjogi	Goa^{7}	12011/44/96-BCC 6 December 1996	
Joginath, Jogi, Nath, Jangam-Jogi, Yogi	Haryana^{31}	12011/68/93-BCC(C) 10 September 1993 12011/44/99-BCC 21 September 2000 12015/2/2007-BCC 18 August 2010	
Jogi (Jugi)	Jharkhand^{43}	12015/2/2007-B.C.C. 18 August 2010	
Jogi, Joger, Jogtin, Kapali, Raval, Ravalia, Sanjogi, Jogar, Goswami	Karnataka^{29}	12011/68/93-BCC (C ) 10 September 1993 12015/2/2007-BCC 18 August 2010	
Jogi	Kerala^{22}	12011/68/93-BCC(C) 10 September 1993	
Garpagari, Joginath, Nathjogi	Madhya Pradesh^{28}	12011/68/93-BCC(C) 10 September 1993 12011/21/1995-BCC 15 May 1995	
Jogi	Maharashtra^{47}	12011/68/93-BCC(C) 10 September 1993	
Jogi, or Yogi	Orissa^{53}	12011/9/94-BCC 19 October 1994	
Jogi Nath	Punjab^{42}	12011/68/93-BCC 10 September 1993	
Jogi, Rawal, Nath, Yogi, Goswami, Gosavi	Rajasthan^{22}	12011/9/94-BCC 19 October 1994	
Jogi, Nath	Sikkim^{10}	12011/36/99-BCC 4 April 2000	
Jogi (including Jogis)	Tamil Nadu^{51}	12011/68/93-BCC (C ) 10 September 1993	
Yogi, Jogi, Nath	Tripura^{35}	12011/9/94-BCC 19 October 1994	
Jogi, Yogi, Nath, Goswami	Uttar Pradesh^{19}	12011/68/93-BCC(C) 10 September 1993	
Jogi	Uttarakhand^{37}	12015/13/2010-B.C.II. 8 December 2011	
Jogi, Jugi, Yogi Nath	West Bengal^{28}	12011/88/98-BCC 6 December 1999	

== See also ==
- Jangam Lingayats
