= Nawabzada Raja Iqbal Mehdi Khan =

Pakistani politician

- نوابزادہ راجہ اقبال مہدی خان

Member of the National Assembly of Pakistan
- In office 1 June 2013 – 24 May 2016
- Constituency: NA-63 (Jhelum-II)
- In office 1988–1999
- Constituency: NA-46 (Jhelum-II)

Member of the Provincial Assembly of Punjab
- In office 1985–1988
- Constituency: PP-20 (Jhelum)

Personal details
- Born: 1 January 1952 Jhelum
- Died: 24 May 2016 (aged 64) New Delhi, India
- Party: Pakistan Muslim League (N)
- Children: Nawabzada Raja Matloob Mehdi Raja Talib Mehdi

Nawabzada Raja Iqbal Mehdi Khan (Urdu: نوابزادہ راجہ اقبال مہدی خان; 1 January 1952 – 24 May 2016) was a Pakistani politician who had been a member of the National Assembly of Pakistan between 1988 and 2016 and member of the Provincial Assembly of Punjab from 1985 to 1988.

== Early life ==
Khan was born on 7 February 1952.

== Political career ==
Khan was elected as member of Jhelum district council in 1983.

He was elected to the Provincial Assembly of Punjab from Constituency PP-20 (Jhelum) in the 1985 Pakistani general election. He then served as the provincial minister of Punjab for forest, wildlife and fisheries in the provincial cabinet of then chief minister of Punjab Nawaz Sharif.

He was elected to the National Assembly of Pakistan as an independent candidate from Constituency NA-46 (Jhelum-II) in the 1988 Pakistani general election. He received 42,255 votes and defeated Ghulam Hussain.

He was re-elected to the National Assembly as a candidate of Islami Jamhoori Ittehad (IJI) from Constituency NA-46 (Jhelum-II) in the 1990 Pakistani general election. He received 57,177 votes and defeated Ghulam Hussain.

He was re-elected to the National Assembly as a candidate of Pakistan Muslim League (N) (PML-N) from Constituency NA-46 (Jhelum-II) in the 1993 Pakistani general election. He received 58,136 votes and defeated Shahid Nawaz, a candidate of Pakistan Peoples Party (PPP).

He was re-elected to the National Assembly as a candidate of PML-N from Constituency NA-46 (Jhelum-II) in the 1997 Pakistani general election. He received 60,237 votes and defeated Raja Nasir Ali Khan, a candidate of PPP.

He could not run for the seat of the National Assembly in the 2002 Pakistani general election and the 2008 Pakistani general election due to not having a graduation degree.

He was re-elected to the National Assembly as a candidate of PML-N from Constituency NA-63 (Jhelum-II) in the 2013 Pakistani general election. He received 116,013 votes and defeated Mirza Saeed Mehmood Baig, a candidate of Pakistan Tehreek-e-Insaf (PTI).

He died on 24 May 2016 in New Delhi, India.
