= Chaudhry Mohammad Awais =

Pakistani politician

Chaudhry Mohammad Awais was a Pakistani politician who had been member of the Provincial Assembly of the Punjab between 1946 and 1954.
