= Tilla Jogian =

Abandoned Hindu temple complex

Tilla Jogian ٹلہ جوگیاں
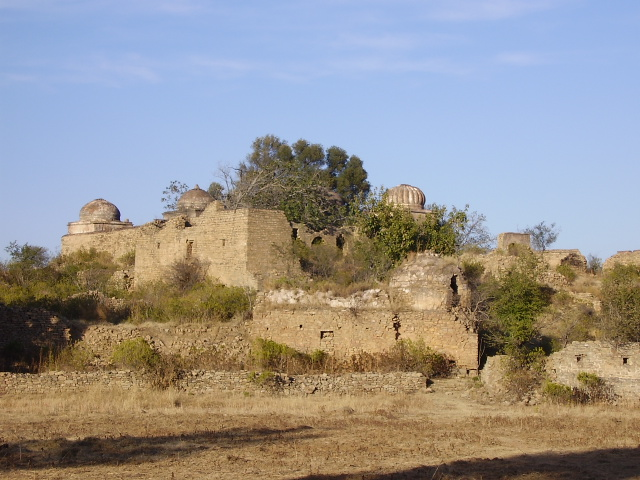
- The 1st-century BCE Tilla Jogian temple complex

- Location within Punjab, Pakistan Location within Pakistan
- 32.860582556°N 73.440342556°E
- Type: Monastery
- Periods: Hindu Shahi
- Cultures: Punjabi Hindu
- Location: Salt Range mountains Punjab; Pakistan
- Region: Dina Jhelum
- Part of: Mountain

History
- Built: 9th century CE
- Abandoned: 1947

Site notes
- Height: 975 m (3,199 ft)
- Length: 8*4 km (approximately)
- Width: 4
- Area: 8

Tilla Jogian (Punjabi: ٹلا جوگیاں; Urdu: ٹلہ جوگیاں, meaning "hill of jogis " (Note: The name of the complex is also known as 'Jogi Tilla'.)), also known as Balnath Tilla or Gorakh Tilla, is an abandoned Hindu temple and monastic complex located on the summit of the Tilla Jogian mountain in the Salt Range in the Jhelum district of Punjab province, Pakistan. Several temple structures exist at the site, albeit in a dilapidated and deteriorating condition. The summit of the mountain is heavily forested.

The complex was the most important centre for Hindu jogis in Punjab prior to 1947, and had housed hundreds of ascetics. In the pre-partition period, many pundits and yatris (pilgrims) visited the site, with the local environment described as being lively. Post-partition, the site fell into disuse and decayed. The site is also important in Sikhism for its association with the founder of the Sikh faith, Guru Nanak. The site also features in the Waris Shah's version of the Punjabi folktale Heer Ranjha, being the location where Ranjha became a jogi and pierced his ears.

== Location ==
The Tilla Jogian complex is located on Pakistan's Pothohar Plateau, approximately 25 km west of the cities of Jhelum and Dina. The complex is located near the Jhelum River and the Grand Trunk Road – the ancient route which connected Central Asia to India. Tilla Jogian is also near the Rohtas Fort, and the Katas Raj Temples – another important Hindu pilgrimage site with a sacred pond that is said to have been created from the teardrops of the Hindu god Shiva.

Tilla Jogian complex is located in Pakistan's Salt Range, on a mountaintop of the same name. The Tilla Jogian Mountain is the highest peak in the eastern Salt Range. The temples are located at an altitude of 975 meters (3200 ft) near the summit of the mountain, resulting in a cooler and wetter climate compared to that of the Punjab plains. The complex is located in an area that is forested with olive trees, pines, and Acacia modesta.

== History ==
The Kanphata jogi, an ascetic order noted for its members' ear piercings, was founded by Guru Gorakhnath, and was centred at Tilla Jogian. After Gorakhnath's death, the mantle of leadership passed onto Lakshmannath at Tilla Jogian. After, the movement splint into two groups which both originated at Tilla Jogian: the Natesri and Darya. The Natesri remained at Tilla Jogian whilst the Darya shifted to the Punjab Plains. There exists a tale regarding a certain Nath saint known as Ratannath, who at Tilla Jogian was questioned for his lack of ear-rings he opened up his chest in-response to reveal his heart. Another tale relates that one time Ratannath had his rings taken from him as punishment but he revealed them in his mouth. In the Gorakhnāth and the Kānphaṭa Yogīs (1938) by George Weston Briggs, it was reported that no Aghoris resided at the complex.

Tilla Jogian's importance as a Hindu pilgrimage centre attracted the founder of Sikh faith, Guru Nanak who meditated here for forty days in the early 1500s, since he wanted to understand the ideology of the jogis, and also debate with them regarding their core beliefs. The reference of Guru Nanak visiting the site is traced to the Gosti Bal Nath Nal recorded in the Miharban Janamsakhi. The tradition further claims that Guru Nanak had met Balnath at the site, with a structure later being raised to commemorate the meeting between Nanak and Balnath. The Mughal Emperor Akbar visited the "Shrine of Balnath," an influential and widely venerated yogi. The shrine was noted by his chronicler Abul Fazal to be "so old" that its origins had become obscure, and that Akbar expressed marvel at the site's old age. Abul Fazal also recorded that the site was important for followers of Balnath, attracting jogis from distant areas. The 17th century emperor, Jahangir, also visited the temple complex. Following the collapse of Mughal rule, the complex was sacked and looted by the Pashtun king Ahmad Shah Abdali, during one of his several raids into Punjab. The complex was quickly rebuilt following Abdali's defeat.

Maharaja Ranjit Singh in the early 19th century commemorated the visit of Guru Nanak with the construction of a stone-lined pond, and construction of a small monument to mark the exact spot at which Guru Nanak is said to have usually meditated.

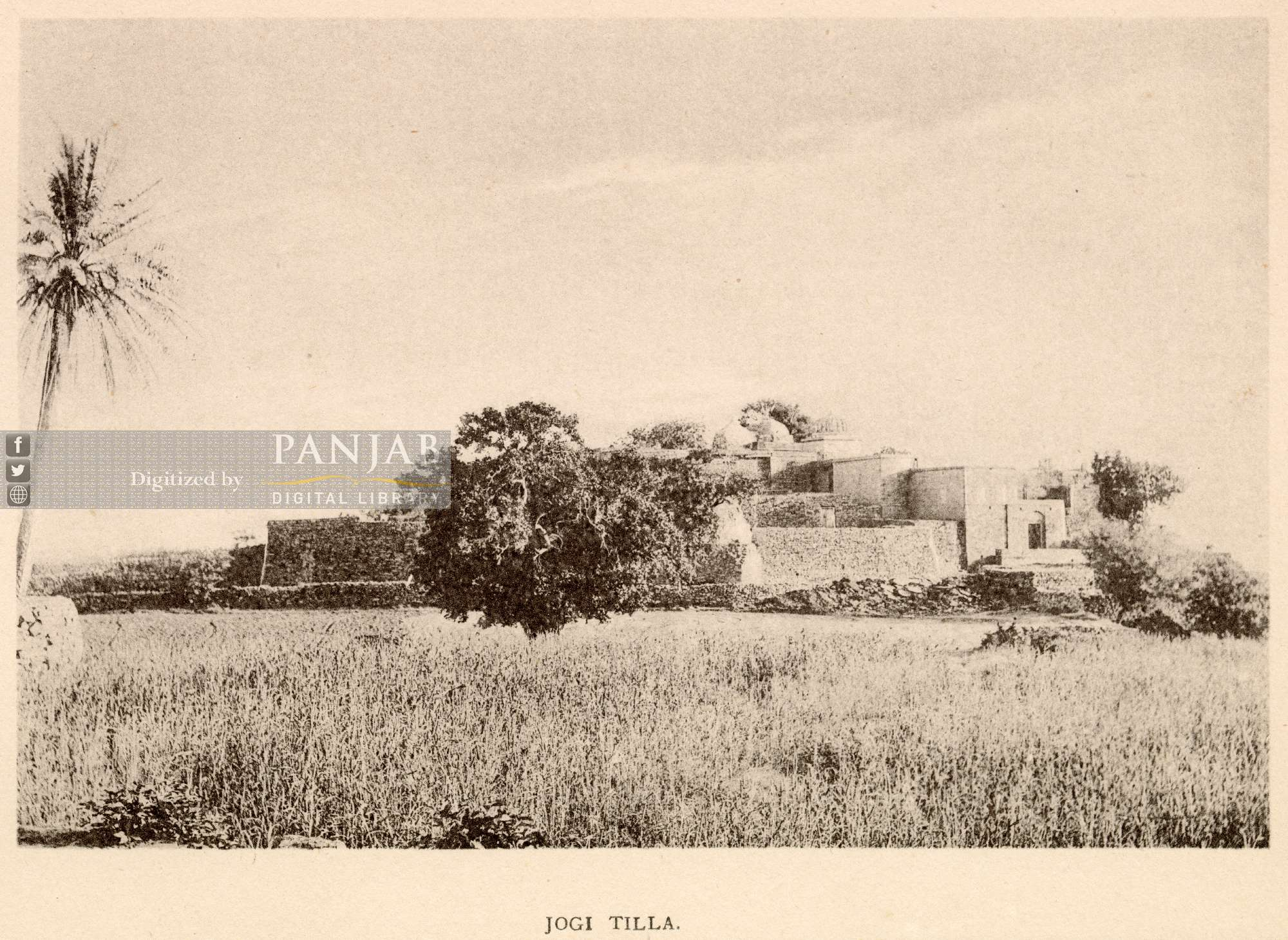
Photograph from 1905 of Tilla Jogian complex

During the British Raj, the local deputy commissioner built a bungalow at the site, having been attracted to the site for its cooler weather. The site was considered the most important pilgrimage site for jogis in Punjab prior to the partition of British India in 1947. The mahant of Tilla Jogian was considered the head of all the Kanphatas of the Nath Sampardya. In December 1924, the mahant of Tilla Jogian assisted George Weston Briggs with documenting the lineage of the Nath lineages and sub-sects. The path to the complex in the pre-partition period was well-maintained and safe, with women making the trek through the use of mules and horses. Immediately prior to Partition, an annual festival took place on the first day of the Hindu month of Chaitra, during which communal meals were served to all attendees.

=== Abandonment ===
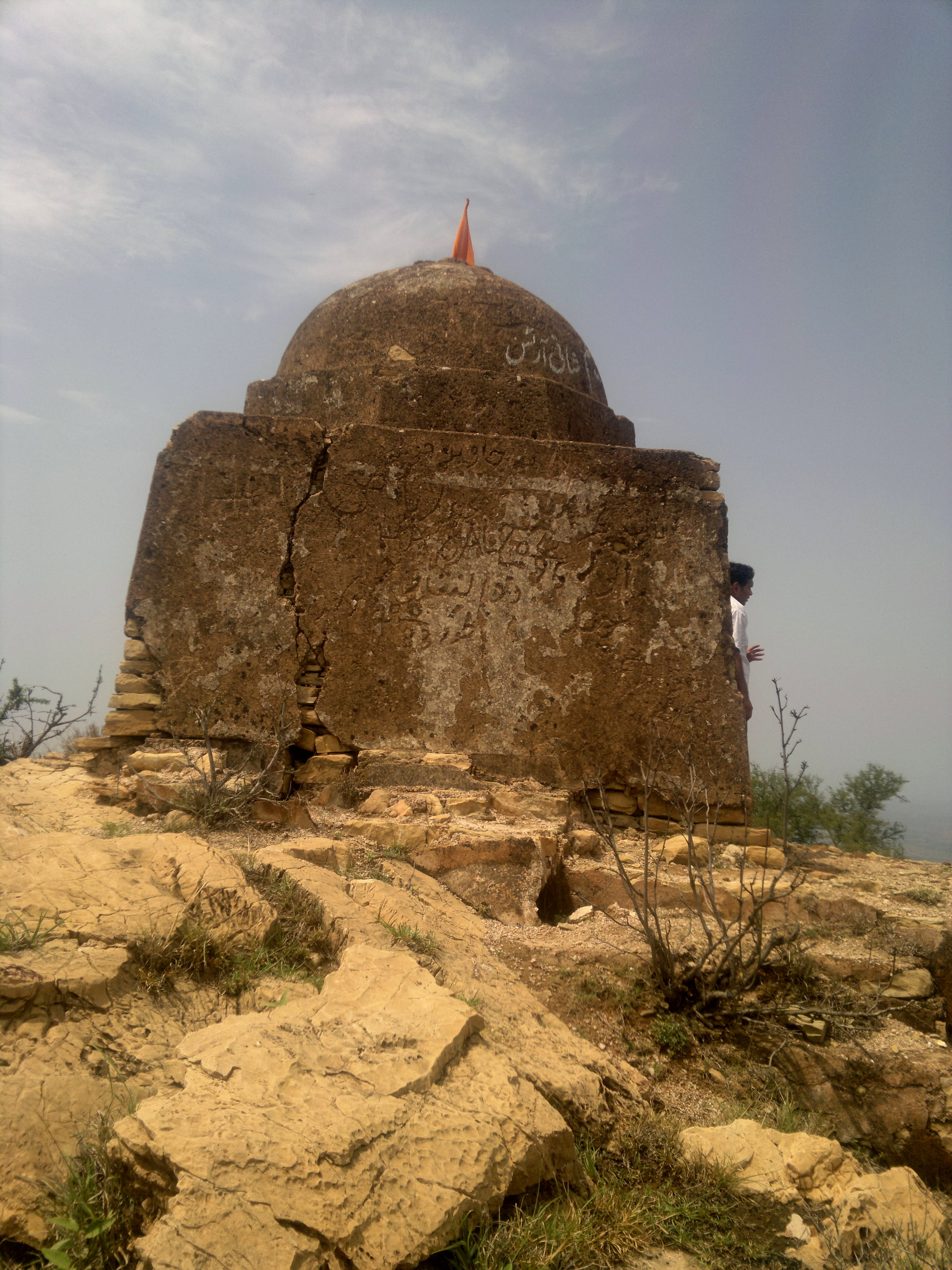
Maharaja Ranjit Singh built a small monument to mark the spot where Guru Nanak meditated during a 40-day stay at the site.

Following Partition, most of the area's Hindu population migrated to the newly independent Republic of India, abandoning the temples which remain neglected until present day. The last priest of the complex was Samandnath Jogi. When riots erupted after Partition, Samandnath Jogi reportedly appointed a local village official as caretaker of the site, and instructed him to approach the deputy commissioner to auction off the temple's belongings if the Jogi did not return from India within six months. The local official then arranged a police escort for the Jogi to safely reach the local train station, in order to proceed onwards to Kangra, India. The Jogi did not return within the six-month time frame, and so the temple's meagre belongings were auctioned. The stone-pathway leading to the site has since started disintegrating and the structures at the site are at-risk for further decay and degradation due to a lack of conservation efforts.

== Significance ==
The site was considered the most important pilgrimage site for jogis in Punjab and was home to hundreds of jogis prior to Partition. Tilla Jogian once also was home to a Brahminical seminary surrounded by extensive residential areas.

=== Heer Ranjha ===
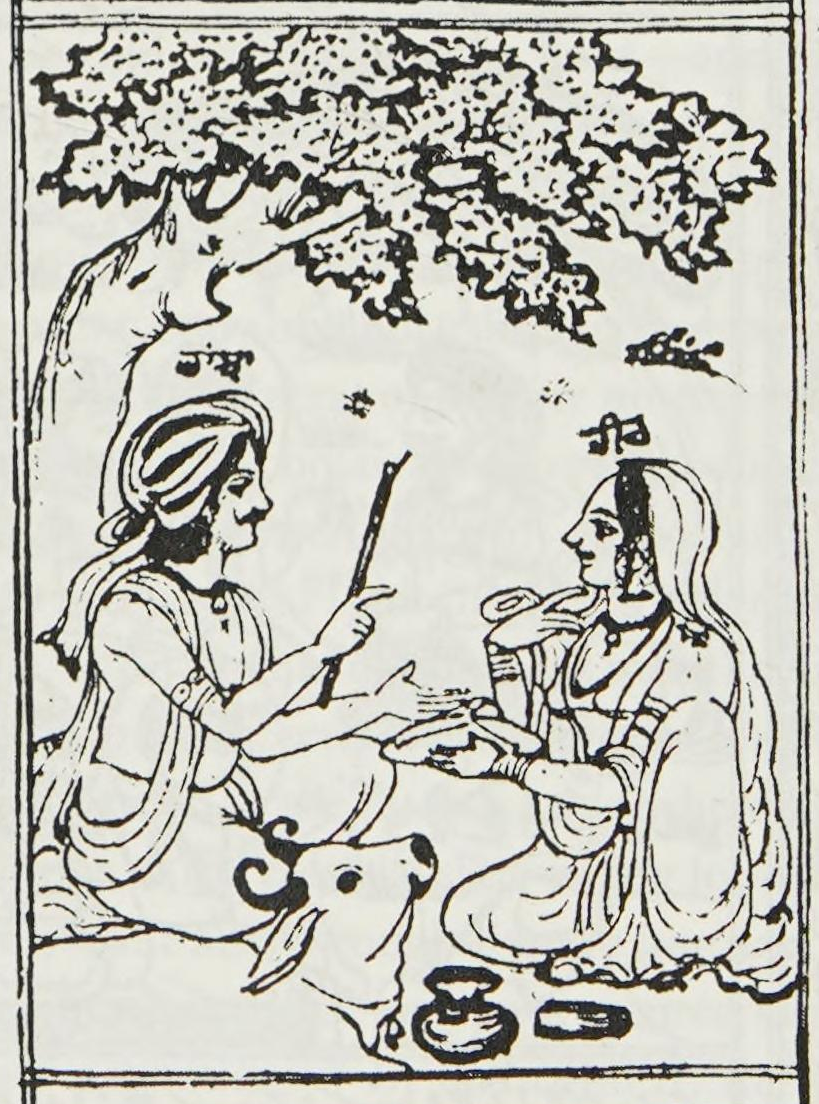
Ranjha depicted with Heer in Kishan Singh ‘Arif's 'Qissa Hir te Ranjhe da', lithograph, Amritsar, 1889

Tilla Jogian is mentioned in the Punjabi poem Heer Ranjha, written by Waris Shah in 1766. Deedho Ranjha, the story's protagonist, who when spending his time on the rebound from heartbreak, sublimating his love and passion in the spiritual world, came here for consolation to his former love. He had his ears pierced here, following the tradition of Guru Goraknath's followers.

== Site layout ==
Tilla Jogian comprises a complex of Hindu temples housing at least three baths and a network of waterworks with at least two minor dams. The complex has a temple-tank (sarovar) that was constructed during the reign of Maharaja Ranjit Singh. Furthermore, there are two cupolas which are provided with descending stairs and various temples.

=== Access ===
There are no developed pathways which lead to the complex – visitors must hike and bikers can ride on dirtbikes or trails to the top of the mountain in order to reach the site. Near the top is an old stone pathway named the Poorhiwaala Rah which leads to the temples, after passing the Ratti Banni ravine. There are number of walking trails to reach at the top: one from Rohtas Fort side and the other from Sanghoi, on the Jhelum River side.

The trail to the complex begins at the village of Bhet situated on the northern side of the hill and is around 3 kilometers in-length, leading to the ascension of nearly 500 meters.

== Conservation ==
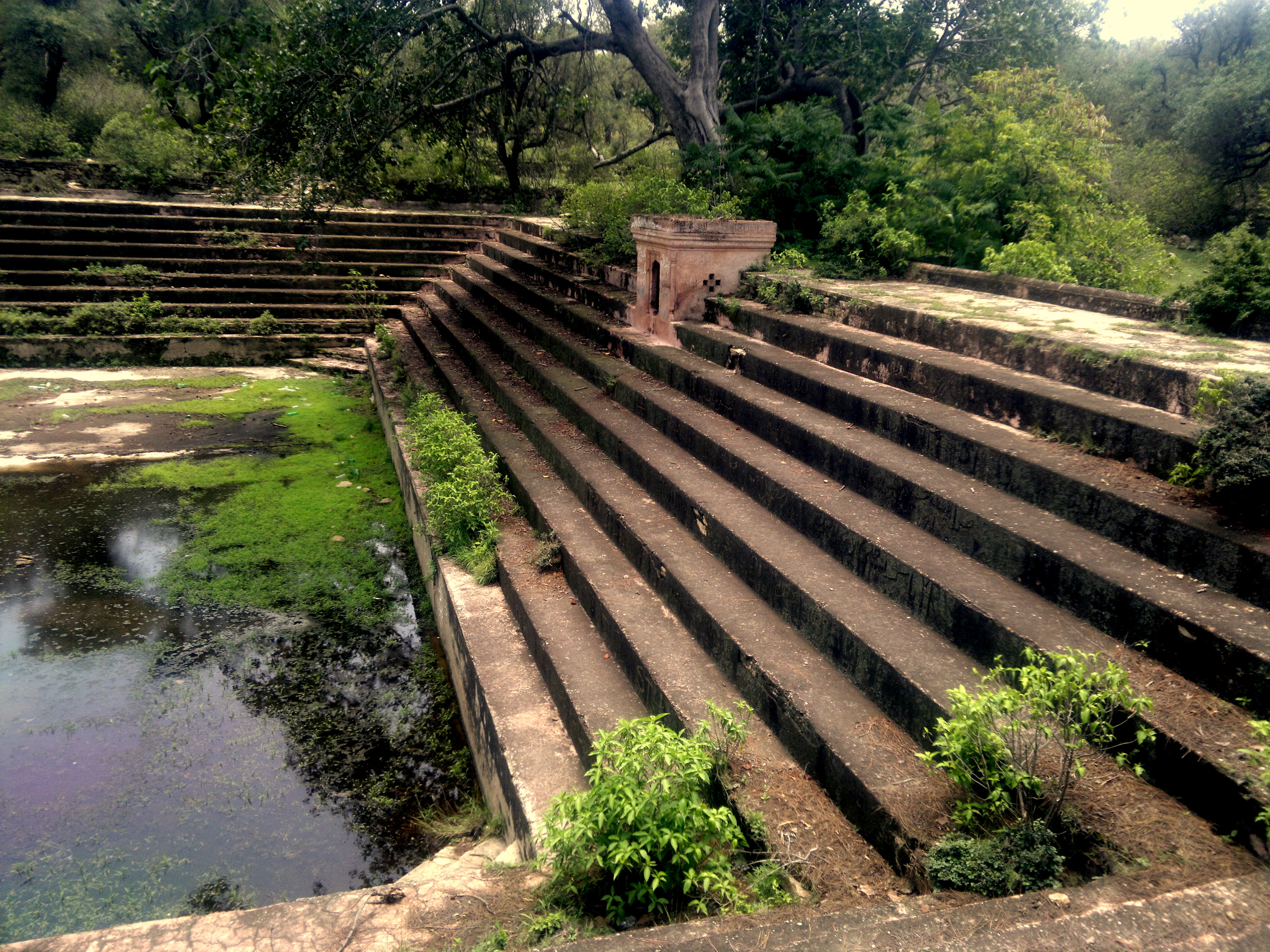
Tilla Jogian remains abandoned, and is being reclaimed by the surrounding forest.

The Tilla Jogian complex is not officially protected by local government bodies and is privately owned. Local villagers have scoured the site in order to find coins and souvenirs to sell to visitors. Vandals have also damaged the site, including the monument built by Ranjit Singh to mark the spot where Guru Nanak meditated. As of 2012, the site has become overgrown by olive trees, resulting in a gradual destruction of the site.

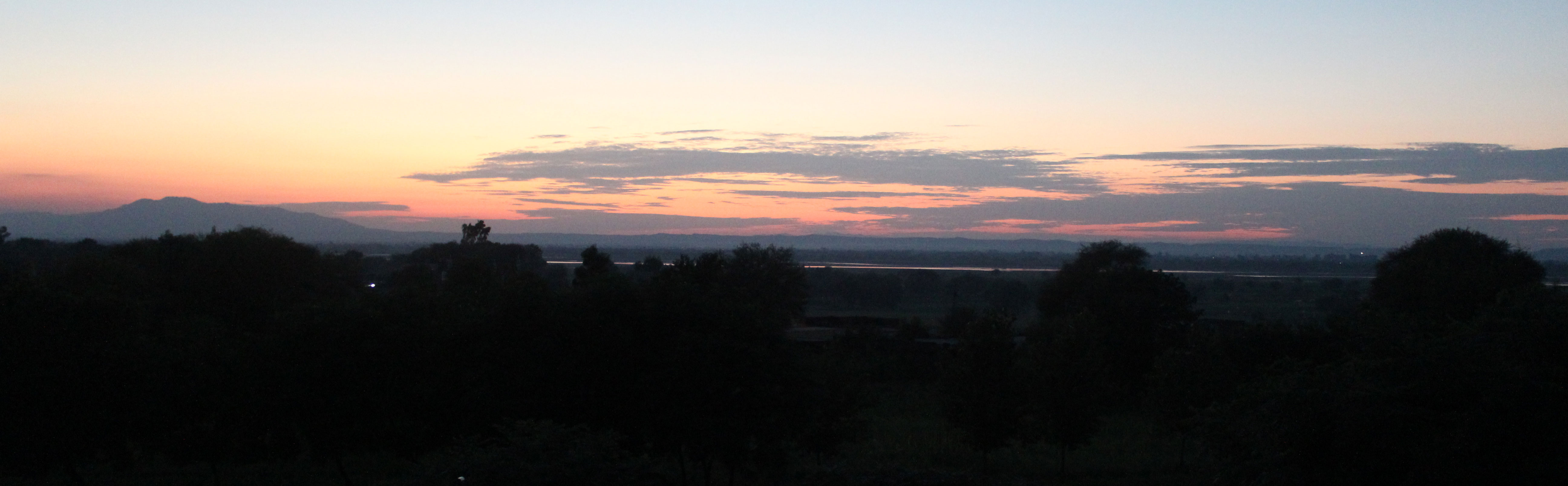
Tilla Jogain at sunset (left), viewed from a village across the Jhelum river, in Tehsil Sarai Alamgir of District Gujrat.

== List of religious heads ==
- Gorakhnath – founder of the complex
- Lakshmannath – successor of the founder
- Pir Kalla Nath (circa December 1924) - mahant
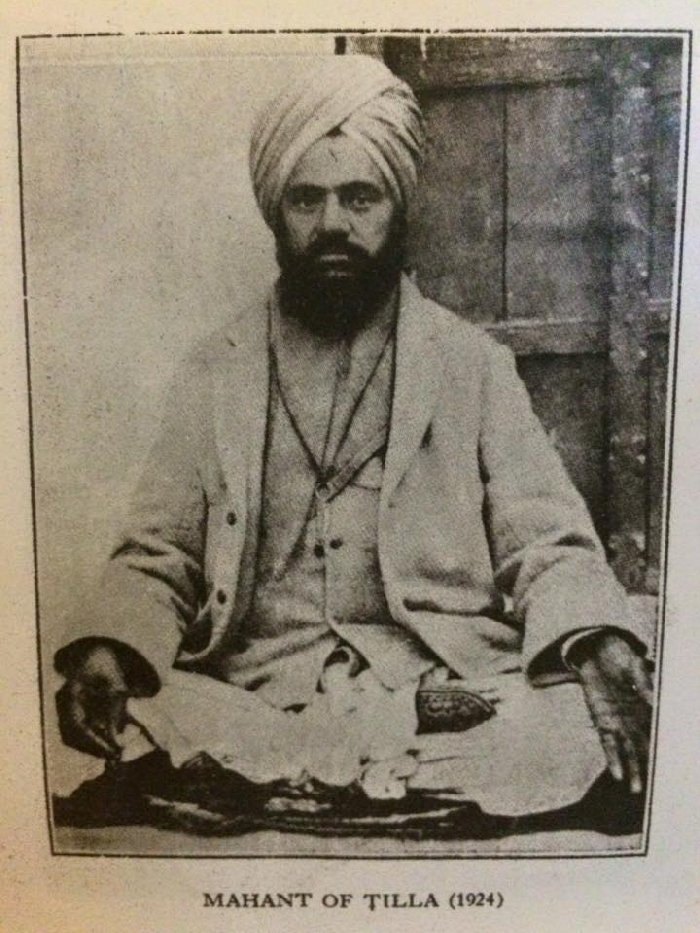
  Photograph of the Mahant of the Tilla Jogian complex in 1924, possibly Pir Kalla Nath
- Samandnath Jogi (? – 1947) - last mahant of the complex

== See also ==
- Mashhood Test Firing Range – Nearby military testing area and firing range
- Katas Raj Temples – nearby former Hindu pilgrimage site. Said to be home of a pond created by the teardrops of Shiva
- Rohtas Fort – nearby 16th century Fort that is inscribed as a UNESCO World Heritage Site
- Hinduism in Pakistan
- Panchmukhi Hanuman Temple
