= Chaudhry Khadim Hussain =

Pakistani politician

- چوہدری خادم حسین

Member of the National Assembly of Pakistan
- In office 1 June 2013 – 31 May 2018
- Constituency: NA-62 (Jhelum-I)

Member of the Provincial Assembly of the Punjab
- In office December 2012 – March 2013
- Constituency: PP-26 (Jhelum-III)

Personal details
- Party: Pakistan Muslim League (N)

Chaudhry Khadim Hussain (Urdu: چوہدری خادم حسین) is a Pakistani politician who had been a member of the National Assembly of Pakistan, from June 2013 to May 2018. Previously, he had been a member of the Provincial Assembly of the Punjab from 2012 to 2013.

== Political career ==
Chaudry served as Nazim for Jhelum tehsil.

He was elected to the Provincial Assembly of the Punjab as an independent candidate for Constituency PP-26 (Jhelum-III) in by-polls held in December 2012. He received 39,000 votes and defeated an independent candidate, Raja Afzal.

He was elected to the National Assembly of Pakistan as a candidate of Pakistan Muslim League (N) from Constituency NA-62 (Jhelum-I) in the 2013 Pakistani general election. He received 102,230 votes and defeated a candidate of Pakistan Tehreek-e-Insaf.
