= Dina, Pakistan =

Dina
- City
- Dina دِینہ
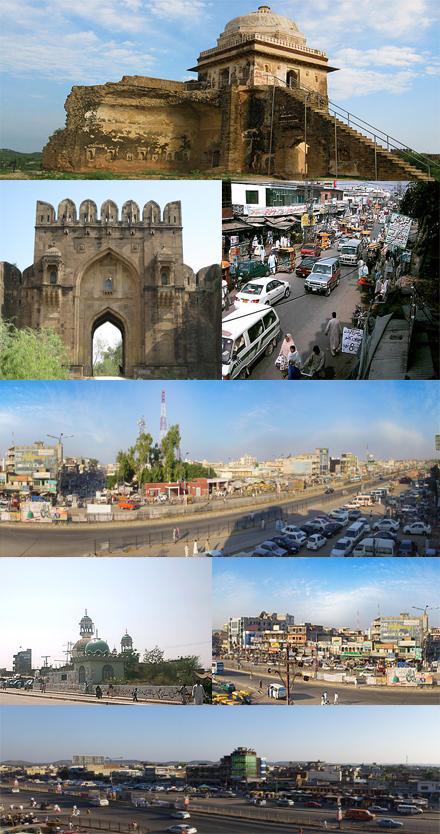

- Location within Punjab, Pakistan Location within Pakistan
- Coordinates: 33°01′42″N 73°36′04″E
- Country: Pakistan
- Province: (Punjab, Pakistan) Punjab
- District: Jhelum District
- Tehsil: Dina Tehsil
- Division: Rawalpindi
- Region: Islamabad

Government
  - Type: Municipal Committee

Population (2023)
  - City: 84,629
  - Rank: 151st in Pakistan
  - Demonym: Dinaywale

Languages
  - Official: Urdu Punjabi
- Postal code: 49400
- Calling code: 0544

Dina (Punjabi and Urdu: دِینہ) is a city in Jhelum District of Punjab province, Pakistan. It is one of the oldest towns in Punjab. The city is named after the Saint Baba Dina Shaheed whose tomb lies near GT road in the Domeli Mohalla of Dina city. The city's populace is dominated by both middle- and upper-middle-class citizens.The city is predominantly inhabited by various communities, including Chaudhary, Gujjars, Arain, Jatts, Rajas, Qureshi, Ansari, and Sheikhs. It is also rated as one of the safest cities in Pakistan. It is a famous town of the Pothohar Plateau. There are many archaeological sites in Dina where the discovery of fossils, tools, coins showed remains of ancient Sohanian culture.

According to the 2023 census, 84,629 people live in Dina city. Dina has provided many soldiers to the British and later the Pakistan Army and is known as the city of soldiers or land of martyrs and warriors.

== Location ==
Dina is located on the Pothohar Plateau, in the north of the Punjab province. It is the heart of Jhelum district. It is bordered by Jhelum and Sohawa to its south, Rohtas City to the southwest, Garh Mahal to the south and east, Mirpur to the east, Chakwal to the west, Mangla Cantt to the northeast, and Domeli to its north. The district of Jhelum stretches from the River Jhelum almost to the Indus. Nearby villages include Mota Gharbi, Khukha, Gaggar Kalan, Gaggar Khurd, Natain, Khojki, Dhok Padhal.

Dina is about 17 kilometres (10 mi) from Jhelum and about 27 kilometres (20 mi) from Sohawa, 190 kilometres (120 mi) northwest of Lahore, 70 kilometres (40 mi) southeast of Rawalpindi and around 103 kilometres (60 mi) southeast of Islamabad, at the junction of roads, one leading to the Mangla Dam and Mirpur, and another to Rohtas Fort and Tilla Jogian mountain. The historic Grand Trunk Road passes through the centre of the city.

== Economy ==
There is limited industrial activity including woodworking, ironworking and marble processing. The main source of income for residents is remittances from relatives working in the UK and the Persian Gulf region. Many residents join the Pakistan Army. There is some small-scale agriculture with wheat and pulses as the main crops.

Salt is quarried at the Mayo mine in the Salt Range hills. The chief centre of the salt trade is Pind Dadan Khan. Two coal mines in the district supply the North-Western Railway. They are the only working coal mines in Punjab province. Many businesses in Jhelum are owned by Arain and Ghakkar families.

== History ==
I reviewed your uploaded document. Here’s a summary of the key information it contains about Ali Asgharabad village: Location: District Jhelum, Tehsil Dina, Punjab, Pakistan. Founded: 1992. Founder: Baba Ali Asghar – served 21 years in the Pakistan Army, earned 12 medals, and was also known as a sportsman. Clan: Jutt Aadhra. Other settlements of this clan include Dhoke Aadhra, Badloth, Khai Kotli, Gara, Sikandar, and Bataliyan. Population: About 200–250 people, mostly descendants of Baba Ali Asghar. Facilities in the village: Masjid Ayesha Siddiqa NADRA facility Building materials shops UBL Bank branch Suggested images for documentation: Baba Ali Asghar Baba Ali Asghar with son Sarfaraz Asghar and grandson Zigham Sarfaraz Masjid Ayesha Siddiqa Other landmarks Google Maps location: WJ77+5R9, Kala Gujran, Jhelum

Ali_Asgharabad_History_

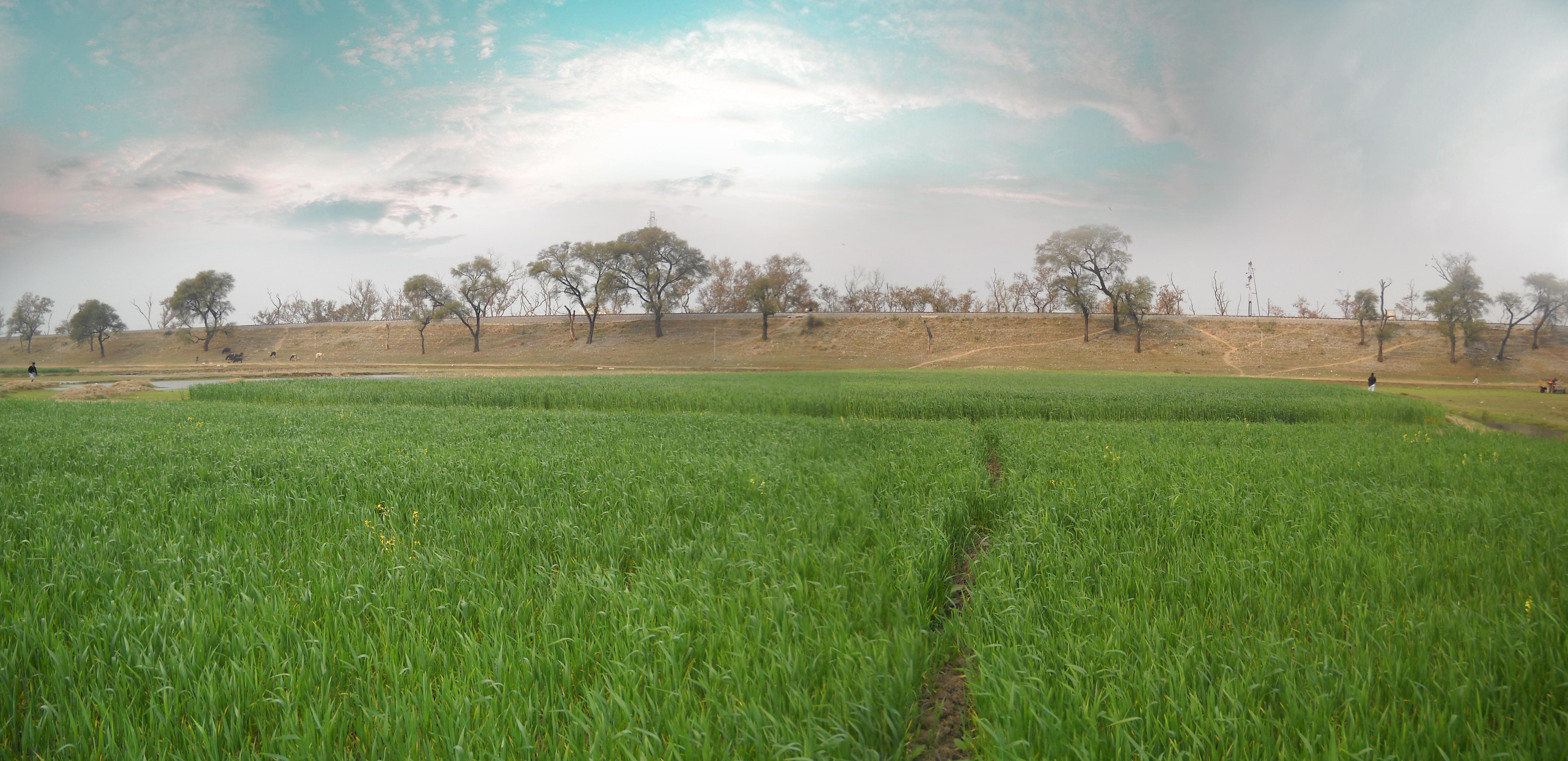
علی اصغرآباد

== Culture ==
The main languages spoken in Dina are Punjabi and Urdu.

Several poets and famous personalities were born in Dina, the popular Pakistani poet Zamir Jafri and the Indian poet Gulzar. Gulzar wrote the following lines for his birthplace:

Zikr Jhelum ka, baat ho Dine ki.
Chand Pukhraj ka, raat Pashmine ki.

== Demographics ==
Population

Historical population
Year	Pop.	±%
1972	16,292	—
1981	23,670	+45.3%
1998	38,790	+63.9%
2017	56,949	+46.8%
2023	84,629	+48.6%

According to the 2023 Census of Pakistan, the population of Dina reached 84,629, up from 56,949 recorded during the 2017 Census. Between 2017 and 2023, the city registered an annual population growth rate of 6.9%. The 2023 demographic structure reflects a gender distribution of 43,478 males (51.4%) and 41,107 females (48.6%).

Languages

Languages of Dina city (2023 Census)
1. Punjabi (86.1%)
2. Pashto (7.90%)
3. Urdu (5.40%)
4. Others (0.60%)

Dina's population was 84,629 in 2023. An overwhelming 86.1% of the population in Dina identified as Punjabi speaking, 7.9% identified as Pashto, 5.4% as Urdu, and a further 0.6% identified with other languages of Pakistan (mostly Saraiki and Hindko) (Note: Language Statistics also include Mangla Cantonment along with Dina city).

== Transport ==
The district is crossed by the main line of the North-Western railway of Pakistan Railways, and traversed along the south by a branch line. The city is also crossed by main road N-5.

== Education ==
- Bahria Foundation College Dina
- Farabi Foundation school
- Punjab College, Dina
- Reformer School System
- National Logistics Corporation (NLC)
- Fauji Foundation School
- Bukhari College
- Govt. Higher Secondary School
- Govt. College, Dina
- Govt. Fatima Jinnah Degree College for Women
- Govt. High School Mian Mohalla
- Saracens Foundation High School
- The Educators
- Dar e Arqam
- Aspire Collage GT Road Dina
- Govt Elementary School Mehsian

== Village ==
- Thekrian
- Bura jungle
- Chak Abdulkhaliq
- Chak akka
- Kalowal
- Hadala syedan
- Hadali
- Pind Jata
- Muftian
- Mehta
- Mohalan
- Maldeo
- Gaggar Khurd
- Gaggar kalan
- Tamma
- Said hussain
- Khukha
- Khokhran
- Natain
- Naki
- Chakoa
- Chakmeu
