= Chaudhry Shahbaz Hussain =

Pakistani politician

Chaudhry Shahbaz Hussain is a Pakistani politician and former federal minister who had been a member of the National Assembly of Pakistan from 2002 to 2007. He is a businessman and owns Spices village lasani restaurant (now sold) and Spinzer lasani restaurant in Saudi Arabia with a businessman and chairman of Pakistan Kashmir Committee Masood Ahmed Puri.

== Early life ==
He belongs to the influential political family of Dina District Jhelum.

== Political career ==
He was elected to the National Assembly of Pakistan in 2002 as a candidate of Pakistan Muslim League (Q) (PML-Q) from NA-62 (Jhelum). He was inducted into cabinet and worked as a Federal Minister for Population Welfare between 2002 and 2007.

== Wealth ==
He owns assets worth Rs. 81.7 million, including a house and restaurant in the United Kingdom and Saudi Arabia.
