= Rawalpindi Division =

Administrative division of Punjab, Pakistan

Coordinates: 33°10′N 73°00′E

Rawalpindi Division راولپنڈی ڈویژن
- Division
- Country: Pakistan
- Province: (Punjab, Pakistan) Punjab
- Capital: Rawalpindi

Government
  - Type: Divisional Administration
  - Commissioner: Engineer Aamir Khattak (BPS-20 PAS)
  - Regional Police Officer: Syed Khurram Ali (BPS-20 PSP)

Area
  - Division: 18,823 km^{2} (7,268 sq mi)

Population (2023)
  - Division: 10,804,250
  - Density: 573.99/km^{2} (1,486.6/sq mi)
  - Urban: 50.94%
  - Rural: 49.06%

Literacy
  - Literacy rate: Total: (79.62%); Male: (85.93%); Female: (73.14%)
- Website: rawalpindidivision.punjab.gov.pk

Rawalpindi Division is an administrative division of the Pakistani province of Punjab. Rawalpindi serves as the headquarters of the division which consists of 6 districts: Attock, Chakwal, Talagang, Jhelum, Murree, and Rawalpindi.

Divisions are the third tier of government below the federal and provincial levels. In 2000, local government reforms abolished administrative divisions and raised the districts to become the new third tier of government. But in 2008, the division system was restored again.

== History ==
=== British rule ===
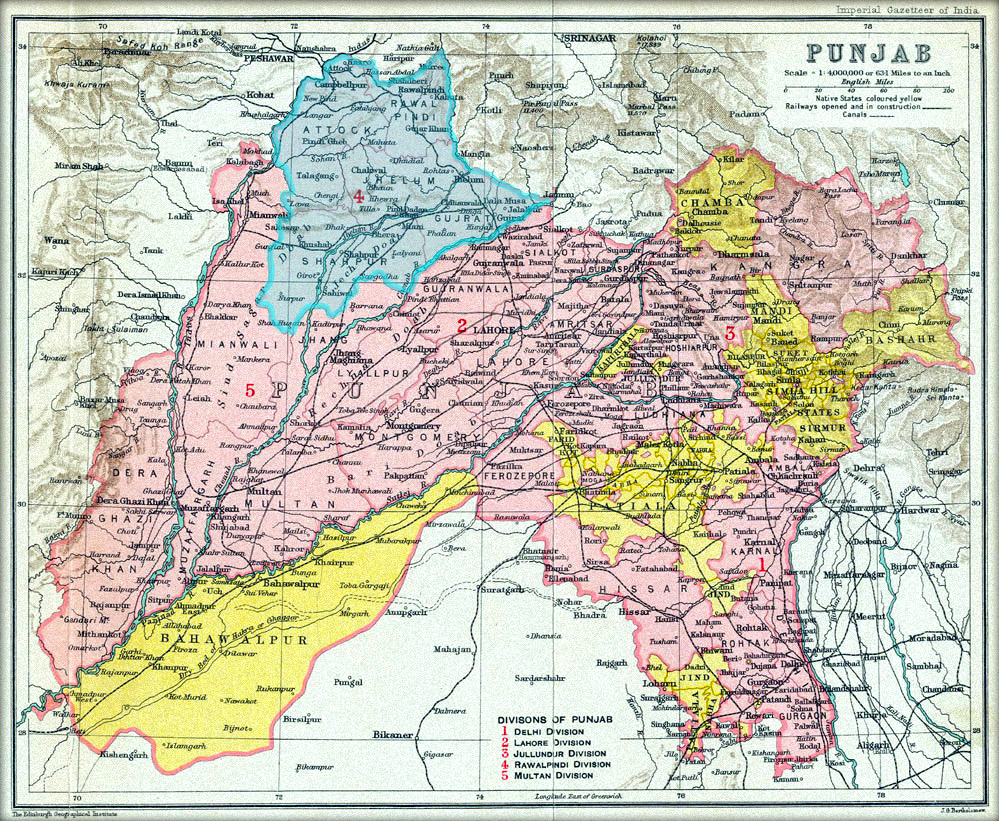
Punjab Province with the northernmost Rawalpindi Division highlighted in cyan

Following the British conquest of the region in 1849, the area around Rawalpindi became a division of the Punjab province of British India, primarily because of the strategic location of the city of Rawalpindi. It was one of the five divisions of colonial Punjab.

The Imperial Gazetteer of India describes the division as follows:

District	Area (sq mi)	Population (1901)
Shahpur	4,840	524,259
Jhelum	2,813	501,424
Rawalpindi	2,010	558,699
Attock	4,022	464,430
Total	13685	2,048812

=== After independence ===
On independence in 1947, the division was one of four divisions of the province of West Punjab but from 1955 to 1970, the division was one of twelve (later thirteen) divisions of West Pakistan province under the One Unit policy. On the dissolution of West Pakistan, the division was restored to the new Punjab province, but parts of the division were transferred with parts of Lahore Division to form the new Gujranwala Division.

== Geography ==
Rawalpindi division shares borders with Gujrat division, Mianwali division and Sargodha division.

== Demographics ==
=== Population ===
The first censuses of Rawalpindi Division were done during colonial rule by British authorities when it was part of British India, the original division of Rawalpindi was bigger than the modern division which is why the 1901 census shows a significantly larger population than the 1951 census. According to 2023 census, Rawalpindi division had a population of 11,406,496, roughly equal to the nation of Jordan or the US state of Georgia.

Historical population
Year	Pop.	±% p.a.
1881	2,520,508	—
1891	2,750,713	+0.88%
1901	2,799,360	+0.18%
1951	1,835,178	−0.84%
1961	2,587,061	+3.49%
1972	3,218,873	+2.01%
1981	3,934,861	+2.26%
1998	6,101,052	+2.61%
2017	9,783,183	+2.52%
2023	11,416,686	+2.61%

Languages of Rawalpindi Division (2023 census)
1. Punjabi (73.6%)
2. Urdu (11.1%)
3. Pashto (8.40%)
4. Hindko (5.10%)
5. Others (1.80%)

== List of the Districts ==
#	District	Headquarter	Area (km²)	Pop. (2023)	Density (ppl/km²) (2023)	Lit. rate (2023)
1	Rawalpindi	Rawalpindi	4,547	5,745,964	1,868.79	83.06%
2	Jhelum	Jhelum	3,587	1,382,308	385.7	80.65%
3	Attock	Attock	6,858	2,170,423	316.7	70.22%
4	Murree	Murree	738	372,947	480	86.01%
5	Chakwal	Chakwal	3,593	1,132,608	314.42	79.36%
6	Talagang	Talagang	2,932	602,246	226.3	74.63%
Rawalpindi Division			22,255	11,406,496	574.50	79.9%

== List of the Tehsils ==
Tehsil	Area (km²)	Pop. (2023)	Density (ppl/km²) (2023)	Lit. rate (2023)	Districts
Attock	1,002	516,277	515.25	74.80%	Attock District
Fateh Jang	1,249	374,726	300.02	66.94%	Attock District
Hassan Abdal	350	253,670	724.77	70.22%	Attock District
Hazro	348	386,544	1,110.76	66.45%	Attock District
Jand	2,043	330,328	161.69	71.59%	Attock District
Pindi Gheb	1,865	308,878	165.62	70.36%	Attock District
Chakwal	2,167	768,622	354.69	79.63%	Chakwal District
Choa Saidan Shah	473	167,537	354.20	79.28%	Chakwal District
Kallar Kahar	953	196,449	206.14	79.23%	Chakwal District
Dina	678	277,182	408.82	84.75%	Jhelum District
Jhelum	586	507,788	866.53	83.45%	Jhelum District
Pind Dadan Khan	1,176	371,971	316.30	73.98%	Jhelum District
Sohawa	1,147	225,367	196.48	80.41%	Jhelum District
Rawalpindi	1,682	3,744,590	2,226.27	83.97%	Rawalpindi District
Gujar Khan	1,457	781,578	536.43	79.72%	Rawalpindi District
Kahuta	637	237,843	373.38	84.05%	Rawalpindi District
Kallar Syedan	459	242,709	528.78	82.23%	Rawalpindi District
Taxila	312	739,244	2,369.37	81.98%	Rawalpindi District
Daultala	N/A	N/A	N/A	N/A	Rawalpindi District
Kotli Sattian	304	120,421	396.12	88.20%	Murree District
Murree	434	252,526	581.86	84.79%	Murree District
Talagang	2,022	457,635	226.33	75.63%	Talagang District
Lawa	910	144,611	158.91	71.37%	Talagang District
Multan Khurd	...	...	...	75.63%	Talagang District

== Constituencies ==
Provincial Assembly Constituency	National Assembly Constituency	District
PP-1 Attock-I	NA-49 Attock-I	Attock
PP-2 Attock-II	NA-49 Attock-I	Attock
PP-3 Attock-III	NA-49 Attock-I	Attock
PP-4 Attock-IV	NA-50 Attock-II	Attock
PP-5 Attock-V	NA-50 Attock-II	Attock
PP-6 Murree	NA-51 Murree-cum-Rawalpindi	Murree
PP-7 Rawalpindi-I	NA-51 Murree-cum-Rawalpindi	Rawalpindi
PP-8 Rawalpindi-II	NA-52 Rawalpindi-I	Rawalpindi
PP-9 Rawalpindi-III	NA-52 Rawalpindi-I	Rawalpindi
PP-10 Rawalpindi-IV	NA-53 Rawalpindi-II	Rawalpindi
PP-11 Rawalpindi-V	NA-53 Rawalpindi-II	Rawalpindi
PP-12 Rawalpindi-VI	NA-54 Rawalpindi-III	Rawalpindi
PP-13 Rawalpindi-VII	NA-54 Rawalpindi-III	Rawalpindi
PP-14 Rawalpindi-VIII	NA-55 Rawalpindi-IV	Rawalpindi
PP-15 Rawalpindi-IX	NA-55 Rawalpindi-IV	Rawalpindi
PP-16 Rawalpindi-X	NA-56 Rawalpindi-V	Rawalpindi
PP-17 Rawalpindi-XI	NA-56 Rawalpindi-V	Rawalpindi
PP-18 Rawalpindi-XII	NA-57 Rawalpindi-VI	Rawalpindi
PP-19 Rawalpindi-XIII	NA-57 Rawalpindi-VI	Rawalpindi
PP-20 Chakwal-I	NA-58 Chakwal	Chakwal
PP-21 Chakwal-II	NA-58 Chakwal	Chakwal
PP-22 Chakwal-cum-Talagang	NA-59 Chakwal-cum-Talagang	Talagang
PP-23 Talagang	NA-59 Chakwal-cum-Talagang	Talagang
PP-24 Jhelum-I	NA-60 Jhelum-I	Jhelum
PP-25 Jhelum-II	NA-61 Jhelum-II	Jhelum
PP-26 Jhelum-III	NA-61 Jhelum-II	Jhelum

== See also ==
- Divisions of Pakistan
  - Divisions of Punjab, Pakistan
- Jhelum
