= Dhab Khushal =

Village in Chakwal District, Punjab, Pakistan

Coordinates: 32°59′23″N 72°52′36″E

Dhab Khushal (Urdu: ڈھاب خوشحآل) is a village in Chakwal District, Punjab, Pakistan. The population is about 800. Dhab Khushal is situated close to the village Dhab Kalan and about 7.5KM from the Chakwal city center.ِ Dhab Khushal is a smaller village compared to neighbouring villages Dhab Kalan, Dhab Pari and Dhab Loharan. Chohans are a prominent tribe in the village along with Minhas Rajputs. The village needs all the basic facilities to deliver. The Dhab Khushal needs the public transport facility, The GOVT. basic health services and Govt. School for boys and girls. Most of the villagers are associated with the Govt. services like Education department and Pak Army.

== See also ==
- Dhab Kalan
- Dhab Pari
