= Dhab Kalan =

Dhab Kalan (ڈہاب کلاں)
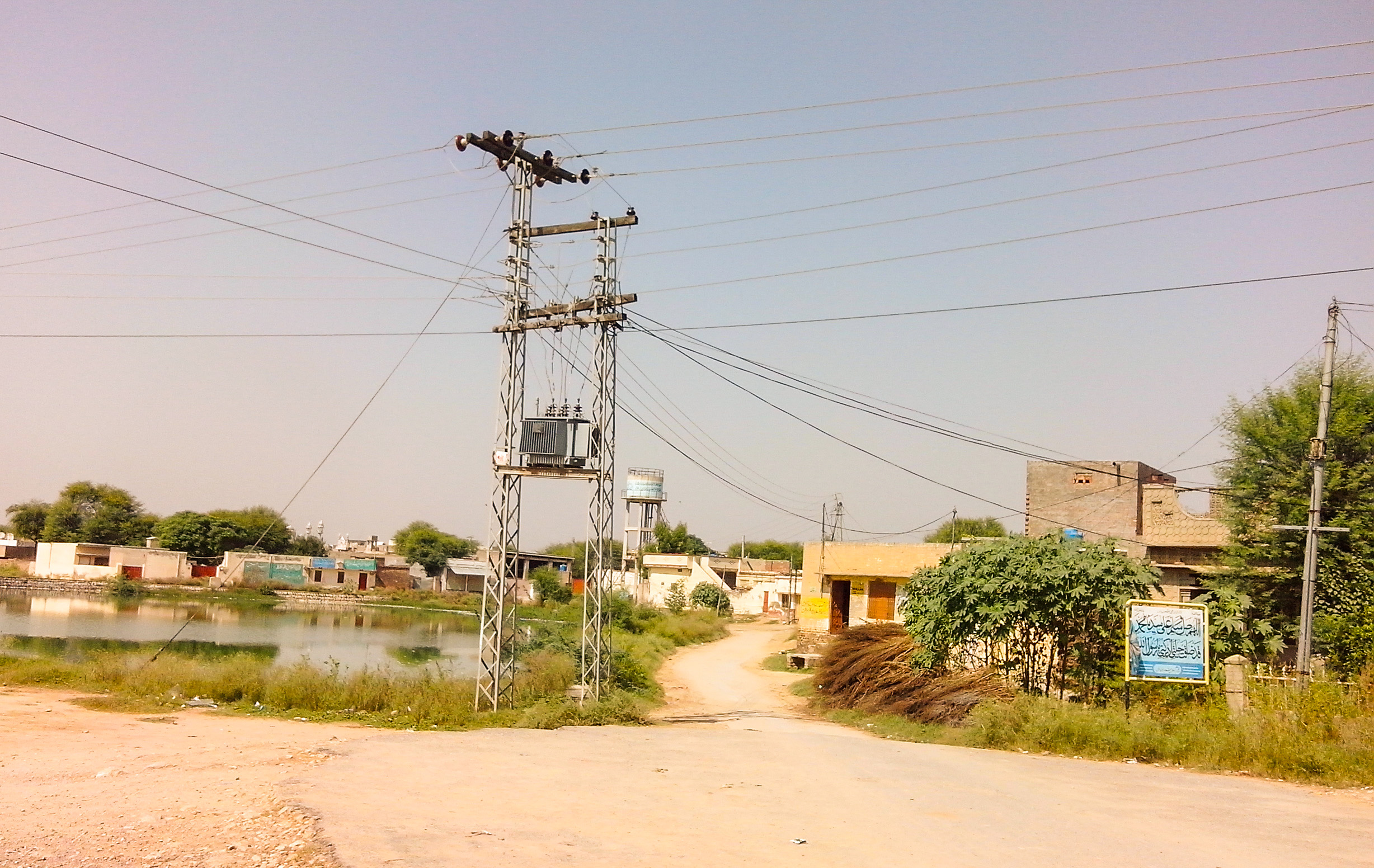

- Location within Pakistan
- Coordinates: 32.995772°N 72.867744°E
- Country: Pakistan
- Province: Punjab
- District: Chakwal
- Union council: UC-20 Har Char Dhab

Government
  - UC Chairman: Chaudry Zameer Khan

Area
  - Total: 0.7 km^{2} (0.27 sq mi)
- Elevation: 539 m (1,768 ft)

Population
  - Estimate (2017): 1,200 people
- Time zone: UTC+5 (PST)
- Postal code: 48801
- Dialling code: 0543

Dhab Kalan (ڈھاب کلاں) (Punjabi: وَڈی ڈھاب) is a small village of Har Char Dhab Union council, Chakwal District in the Punjab Province of Pakistan.

The village is one of the four villages called Har Char Dhab (Punjabi: ہر چار ڈھاب). It is located 8 km to the north of Chakwal city on Mandra Road.

Dhab Kalan existed before Pakistan won independence and some Hindu inhabitants migrated to the new country India after Partition of India. At the time the village headman was Feroze Khan Numberdar.

== History ==
Dhab Kalan existed before the Partition of India. Tombstones on some graves in a nearby old graveyard mention the year of death as 1938.

== Etymology ==
The first hypothesis states that Dhab Kalan is a Persian and/or Punjabi language word in which "Dhab" means promontory (ڈہابہ یا ٹیلہ) and "Kalan"" means large (بڑا), jointly suggesting Dhab Kalan meanings large promontory ( بلند اور بڑا مقام یا ٹیلہ) which actually shows the site of the village as it is situated on a natural and large elevation.

Second hypothesis suggests that "Dhab" word came from Sanskrit where it means pond and "Kalan" means as large making a combined meaning of "a large pond" which is actually close enough to geography of the village as it holds three natural ponds surrounding it. When applying the same hypothesis to surrounding four villages (also named with Dhab prefix), it is notable that all those villages hold minimum of one "Dhab" or pond which provides an evidence that four villages are named after existence of one or more natural pond (Dhab) around them.

== People ==
=== Occupation ===
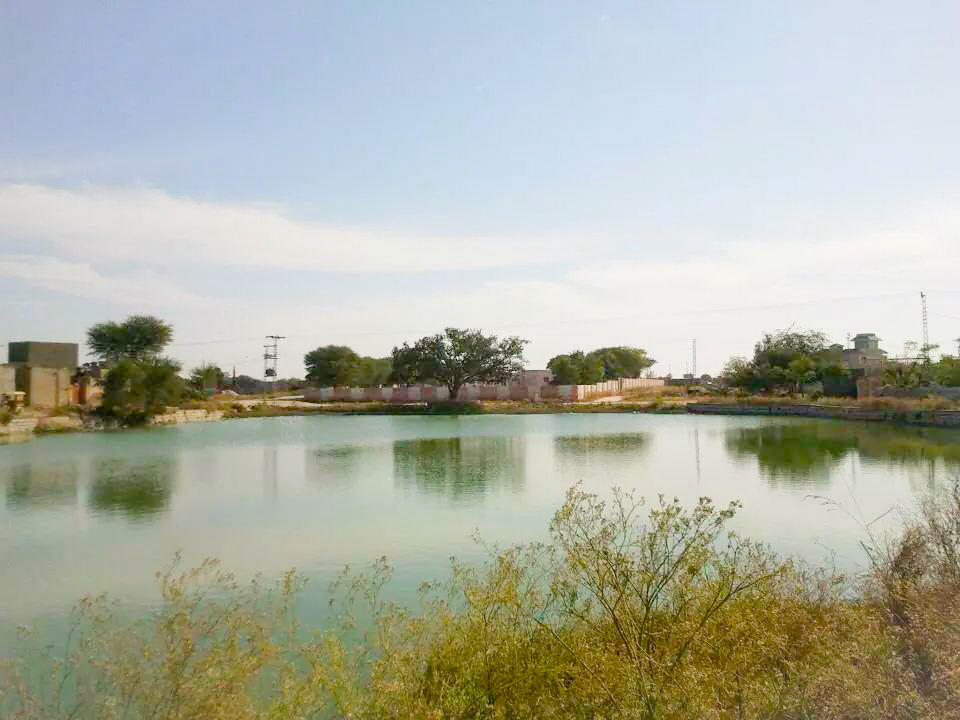
A view of the village Dhab Kalan.

Most of the people are farmers by occupation but new generation have trended towards government and private services. People are also working abroad in Saudi Arabia, Dubai and Muscat. Many others are serving in armed forces, education department and federal government services.

=== Education ===
The literacy rate is high in this village as people had shown keen interest to get an education in the last two decades of 2010 and 2020. There is a government school named "Government Elementary School" which work under district administration. Girls have shown key trend towards education over boys.

Govt high school dhab kalan for boys is famous & oldest educational institute in dhab kalan

Historical evidence of first school in the area remains in Dhab Pari, the nearby village where Noor Khan Gandhi laid foundation of a school for girls education in year 1936. The founder also constructed a hostel so that girls from surrounding districts can live here and go through their education. The foundation of this school played a significant role to uplift literacy rate in surrounding areas.

=== Languages ===
Inhabitants of Dhab Kalan village speak Punjabi Language in Chakwal district accent. Urdu and English are secondary languages for communication.

=== Religion ===
All the villagers are Muslim belong to Sunni thoughts of school. Five mosques located at different positions of village.

== See also ==
- Dhab Khushal
- Dhab Pari

== Picture Gallery ==
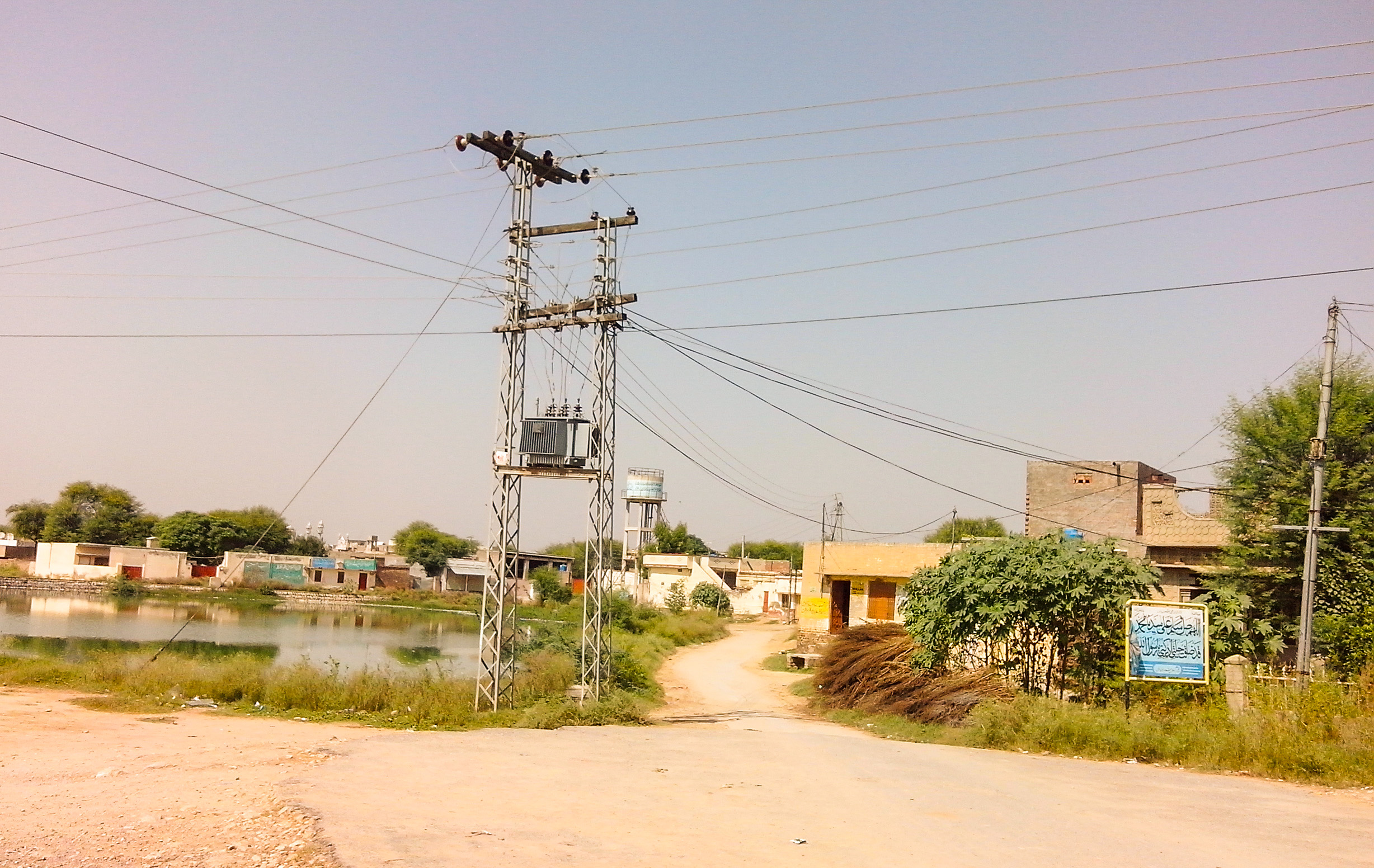
Entrance

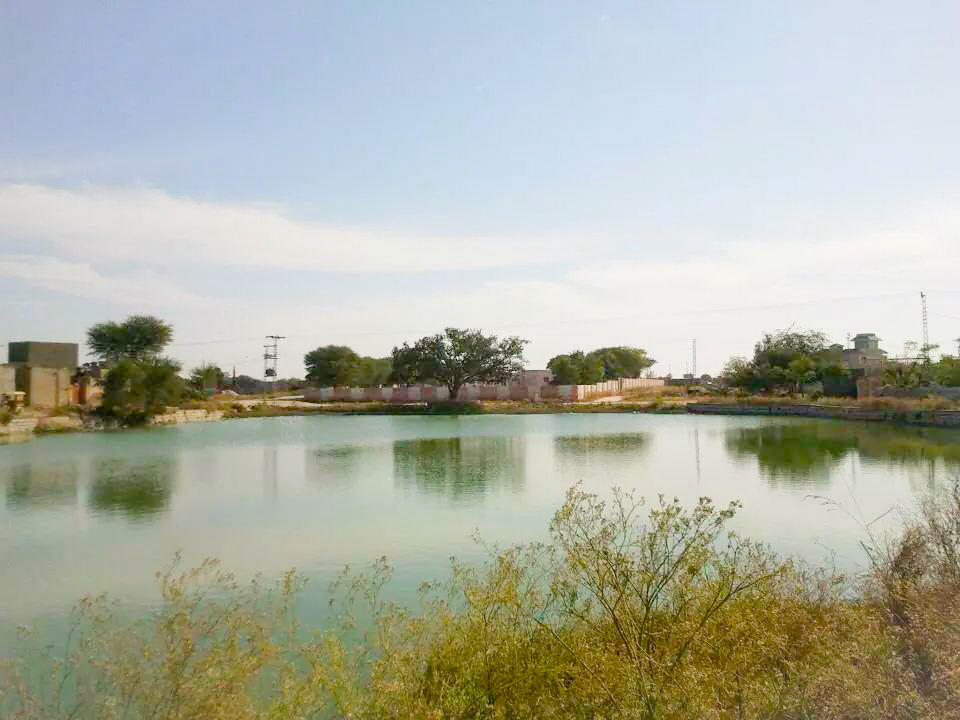
Chapper

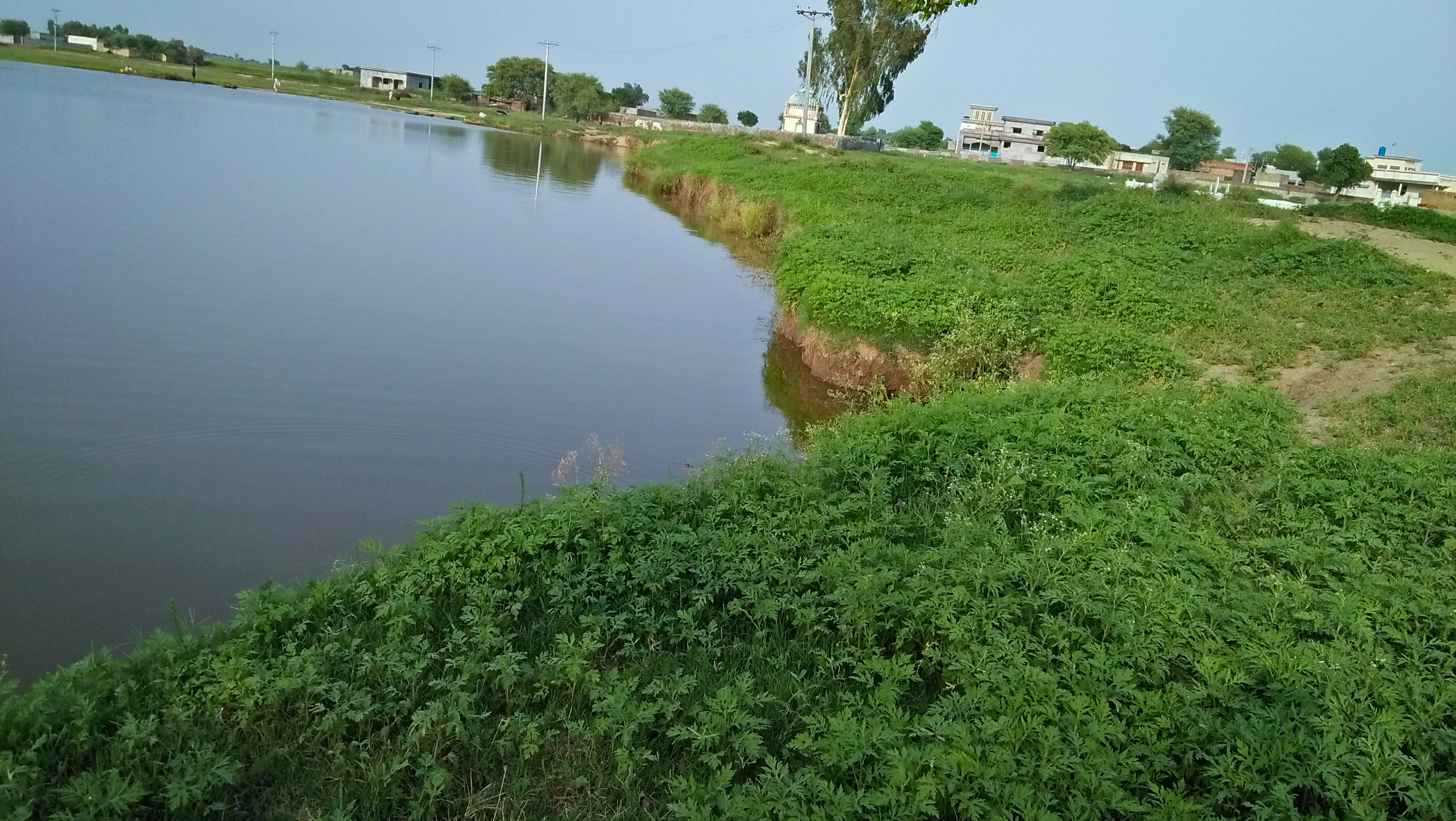
Greenery

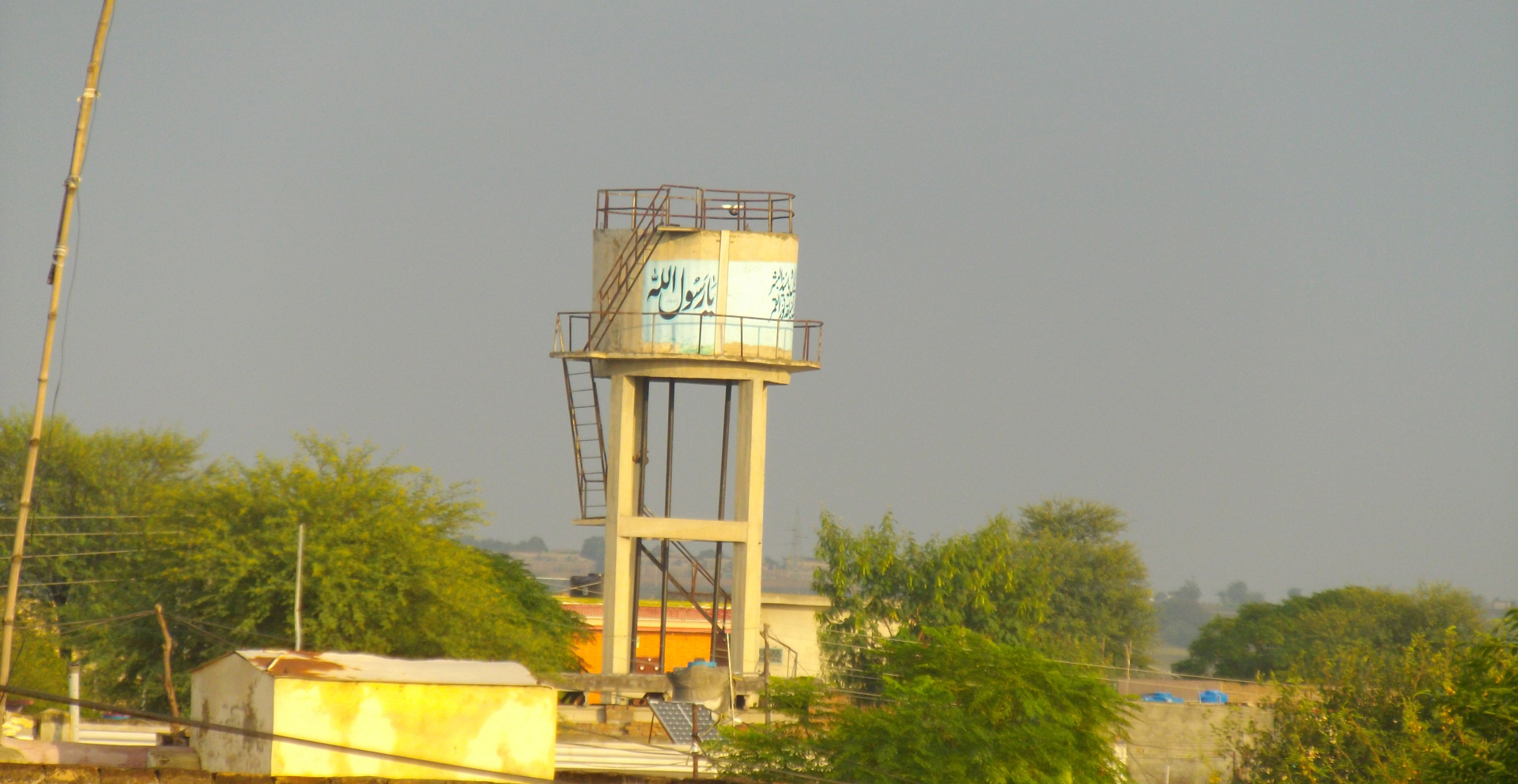
Water tank

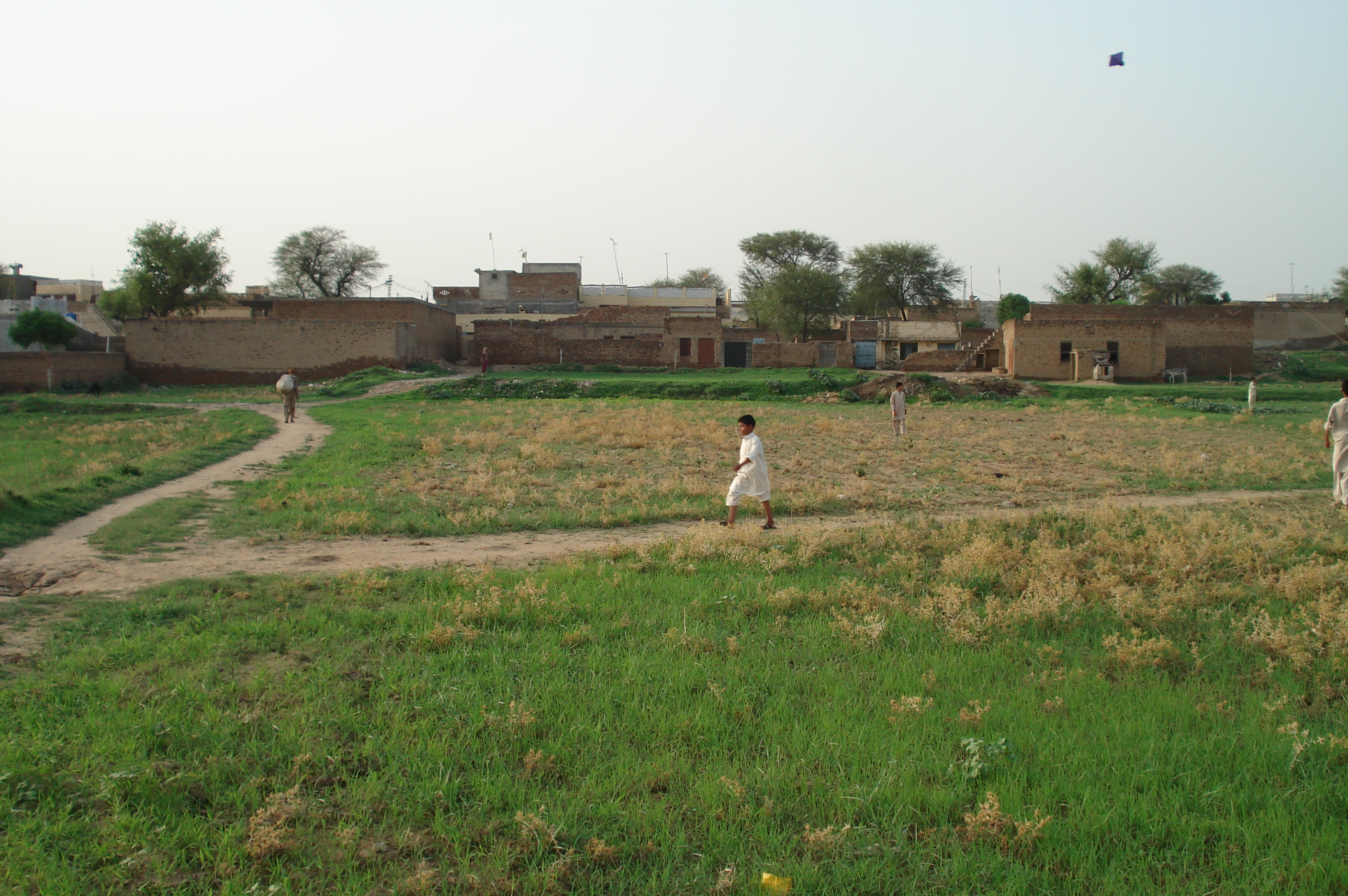
Outside view

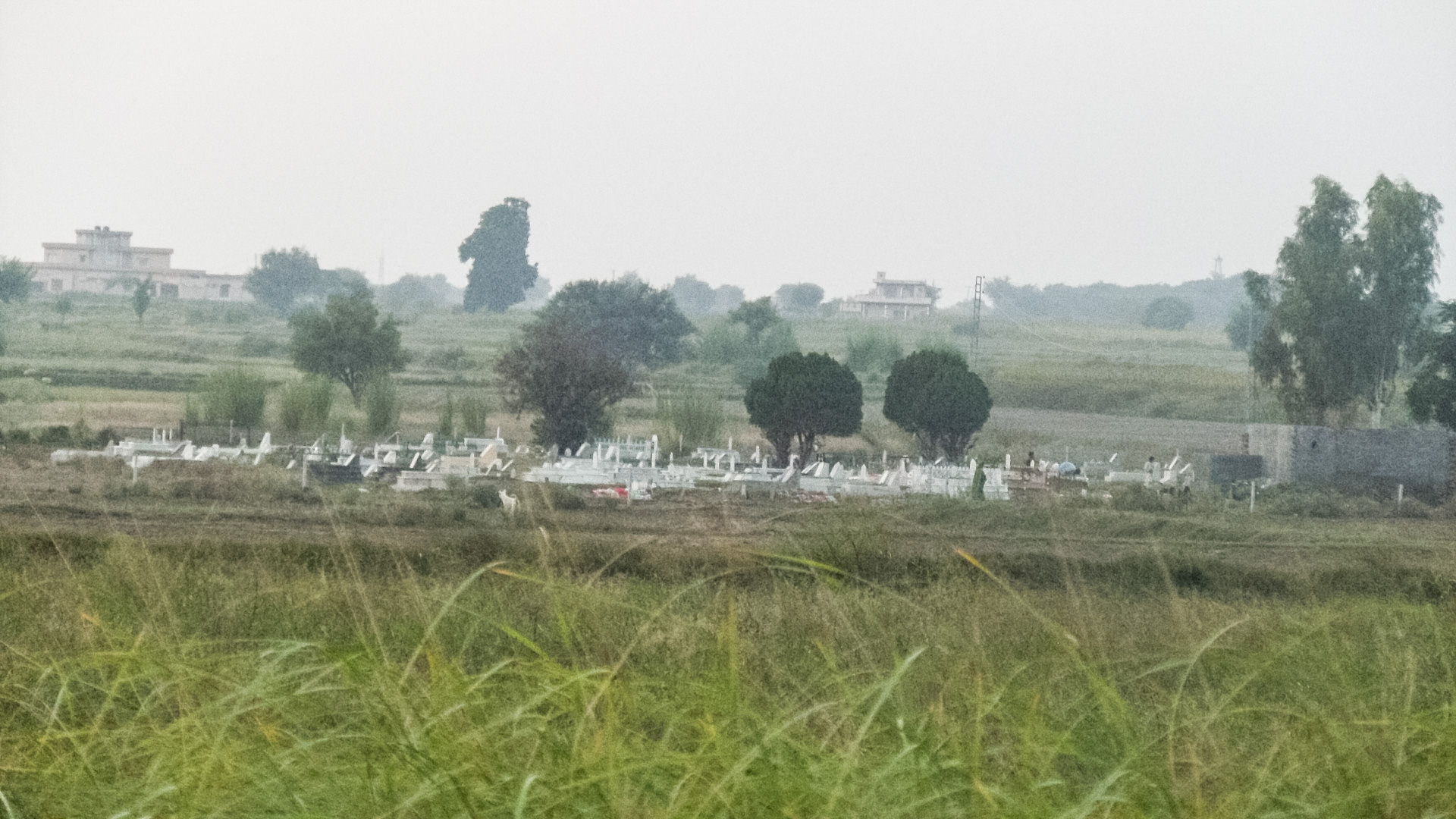
The graveyard

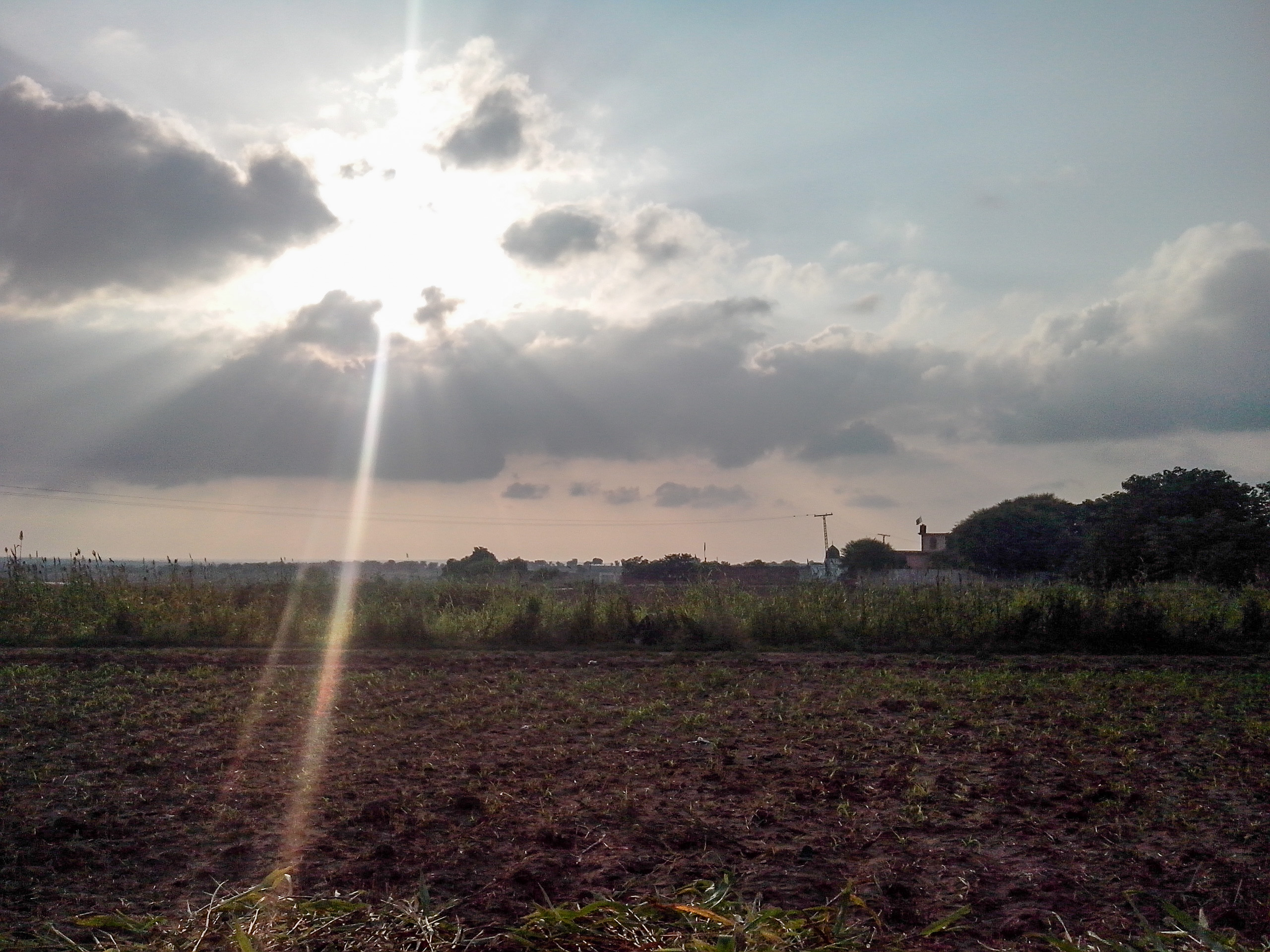
Sunshine view

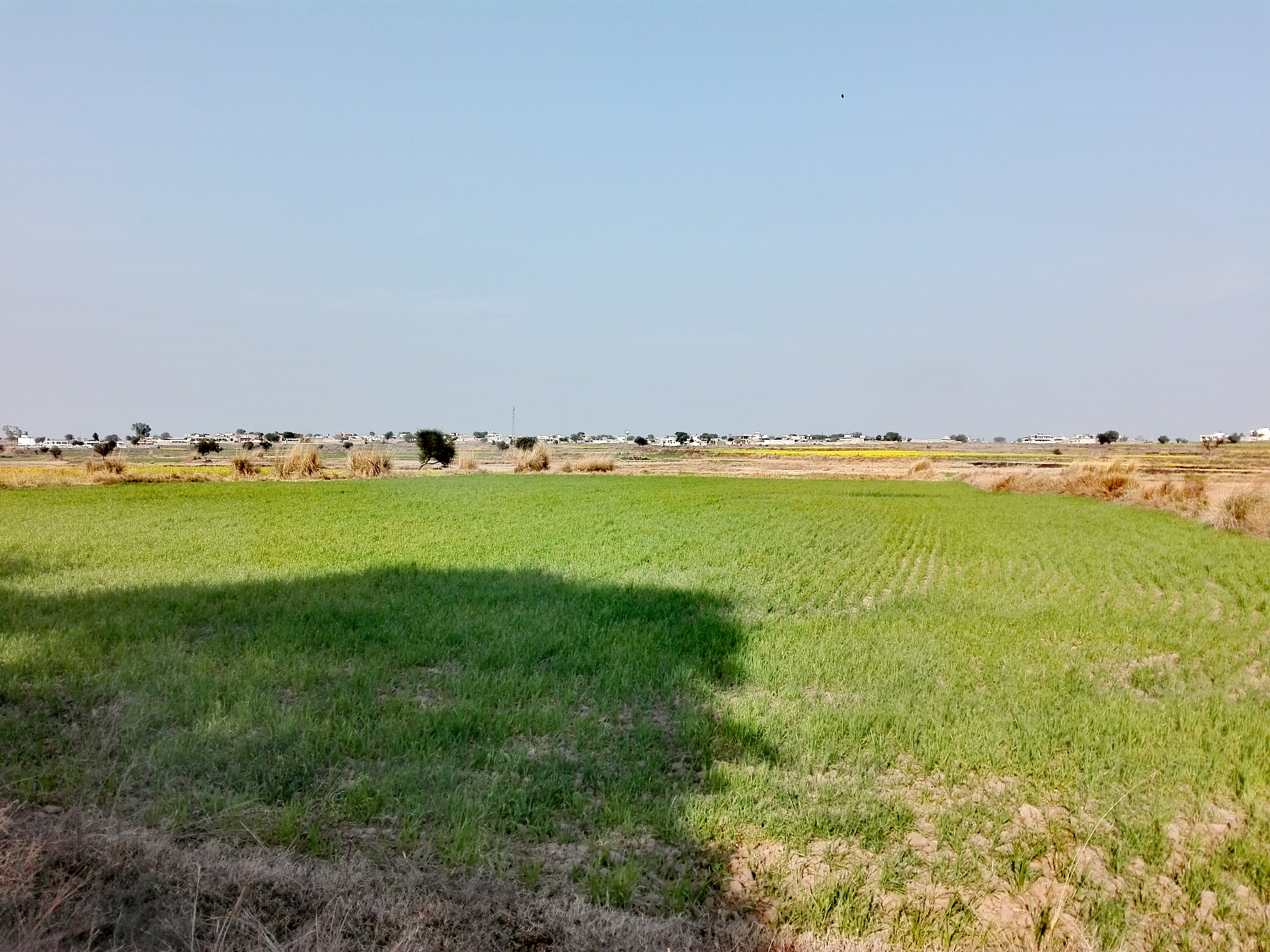
Outside view

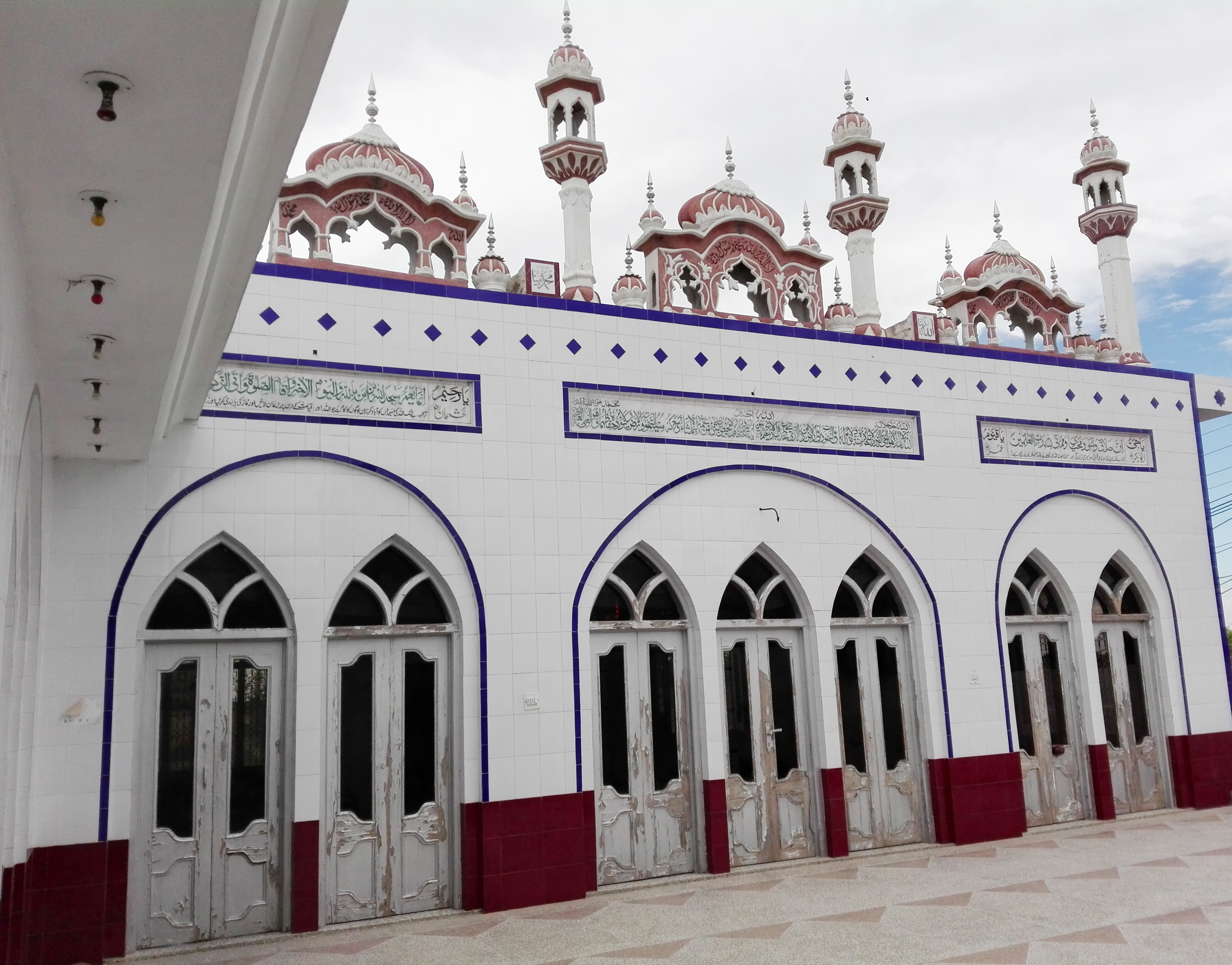
Jamia Masjid Bilal (R.A)

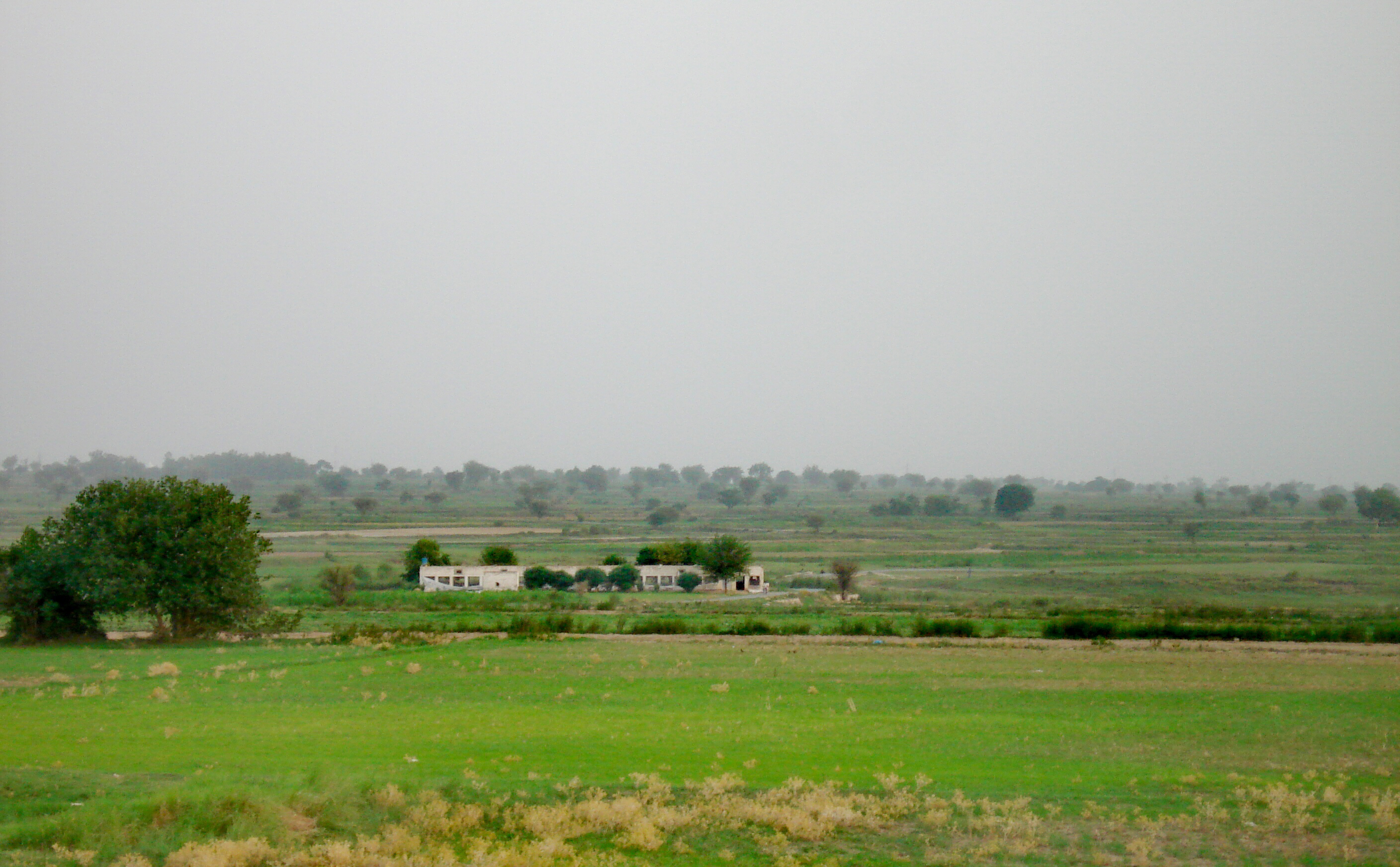
Nature
