= Sardar Aftab Akbar Khan =

Pakistani politician

Member of the Provincial Assembly of the Punjab
- In office 15 August 2018 – 14 January 2023
- Constituency: PP-23 Chakwal-III

Personal details
- Party: PTI (2018-present)
- Relations: Sardar Ghulam Abbas (brother)

Sardar Aftab Akbar Khan is a Pakistani politician who had been a member of the Provincial Assembly of the Punjab from August 2018 till January 2023. He also served as Chairman Punjab Education Foundation.

== Political career ==
He was elected to the Provincial Assembly of the Punjab as a candidate of the Pakistan Tehreek-e-Insaf (PTI) from PP-23 Chakwal-III in the 2018 Punjab provincial election.

He ran for a seat in the Provincial Assembly from PP-21 Chakwal-I as a candidate of the PTI in the 2023 Punjab provincial election.
