= Hafiz Ammar Yasir =

Pakistani politician

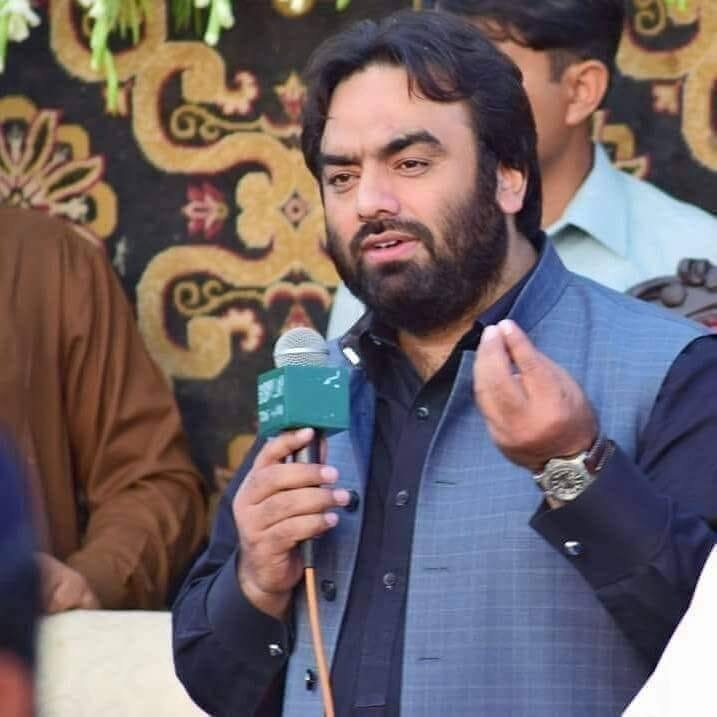
- Hafiz Ammar Yasir in 2021

Provincial Minister of Punjab for Mines and Mineral
- In office 6 September 2018 – 18 January 2019

Member of the Provincial Assembly of the Punjab
- In office 15 August 2018 – 14 January 2023
- Constituency: PP-24 Chakwal-IV

Personal details
- Born: Talagang, Punjab, Pakistan
- Party: PTI (2023-present)
- Other political affiliations: PML(Q) (2018-2023)

Hafiz Ammar Yasir (Urdu: حافظ عمار یاسر) is a Pakistani politician who had been a member of the Provincial Assembly of the Punjab from August 2018 till January 2023. He served as Provincial Minister of Punjab for Mines and Mineral from 6 September 2018 to 18 January 2019.

== Education ==
He declared as “Hafiz Quran” as his educational qualification.

== Political career ==
He belongs to a humble lower-middle-class family. He associated himself with Tablighi Jamaat, where he got a chance to develop relations with Chaudhry family of Gujrat.

He was elected to the Provincial Assembly of the Punjab as a candidate of the Pakistan Muslim League (Q) from PP-24 Chakwal-IV in the 2018 Punjab provincial election.

On 27 August 2018, he was inducted into the provincial Punjab cabinet of Chief Minister Sardar Usman Buzdar without any ministerial portfolio. On 6 September 2018, he was appointed Provincial Minister of Punjab for mines and mineral.

On 18 January 2019, he resigned as Provincial Minister of Punjab for mines and mineral citing pressure on work.

On 21 February 2023, after the dissolution of the Provincial Assembly, Yasir, along with former Chief Minister Chaudhry Pervaiz Elahi and eight other former PML(Q) MPAs, joined the Pakistan Tehreek-e-Insaf (PTI).

He ran for a seat in the Provincial Assembly from PP-24 Chakwal-IV as a candidate of the PTI in the 2024 Punjab provincial election.
