= Chakwal District =

District in Punjab, Pakistan

Chakwal ضلع چکوال
- District of Punjab
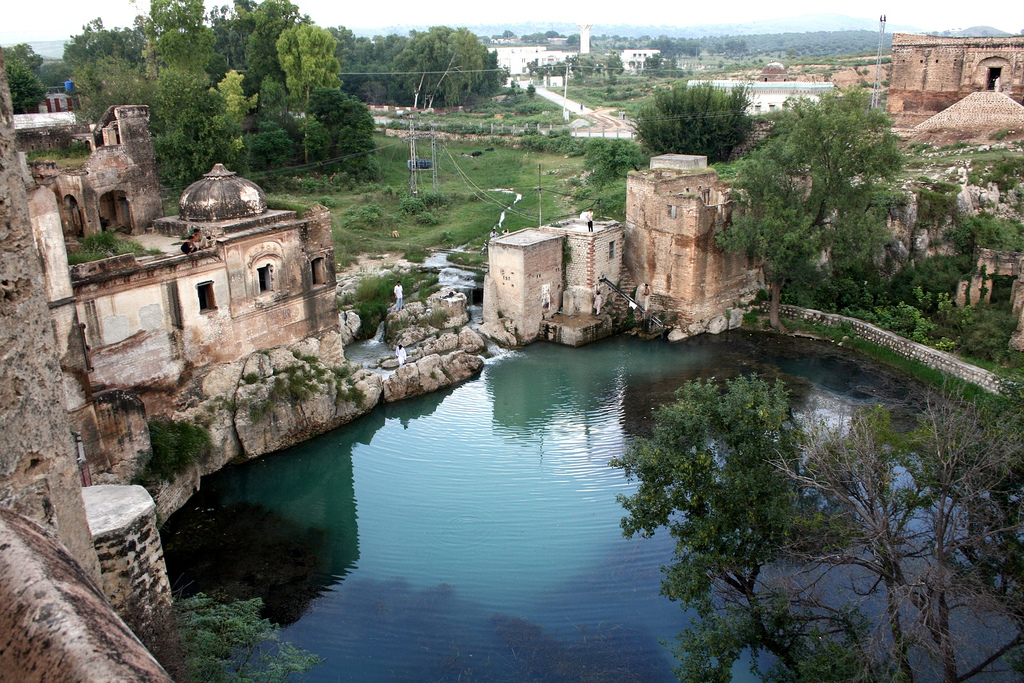
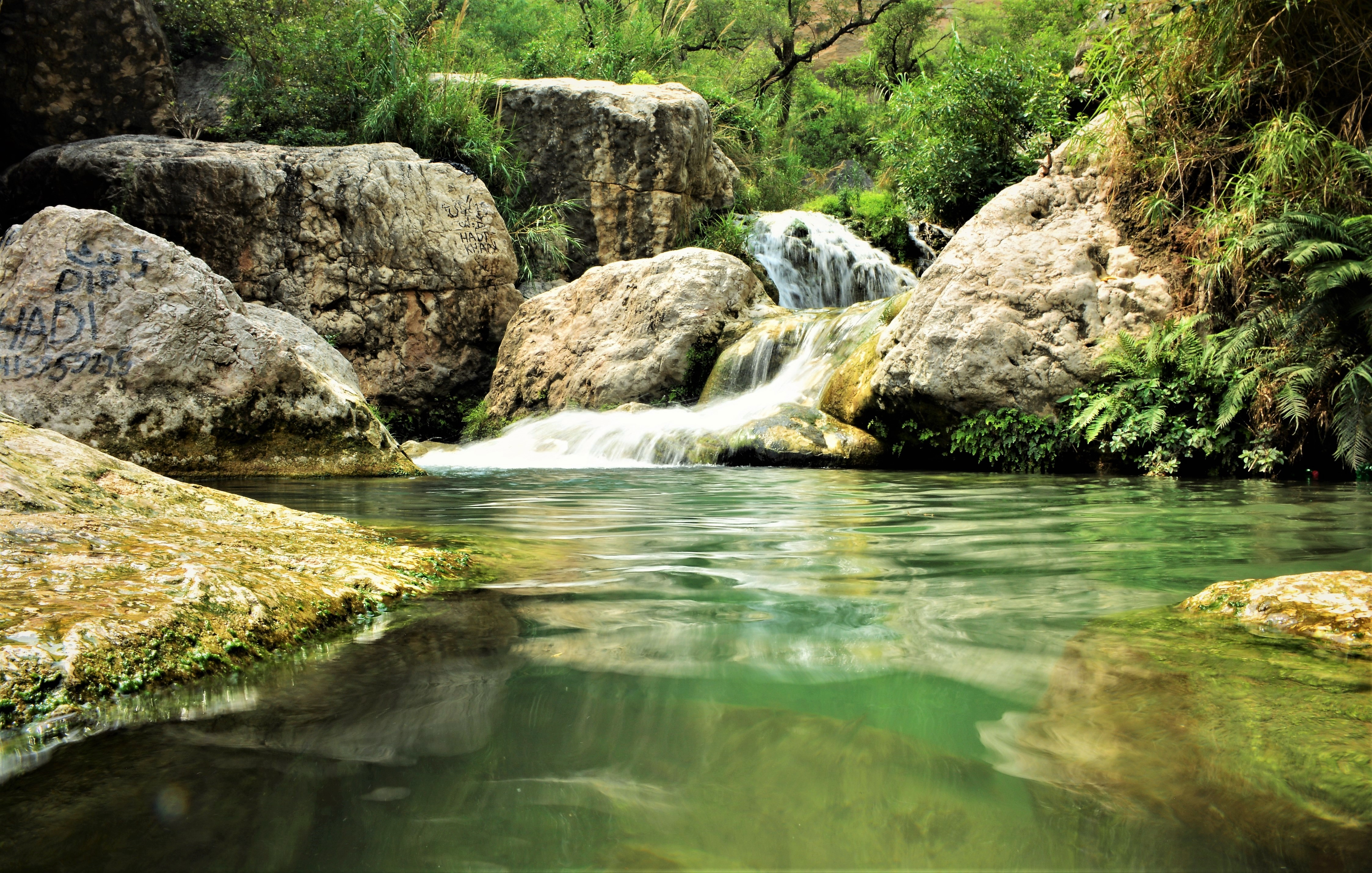
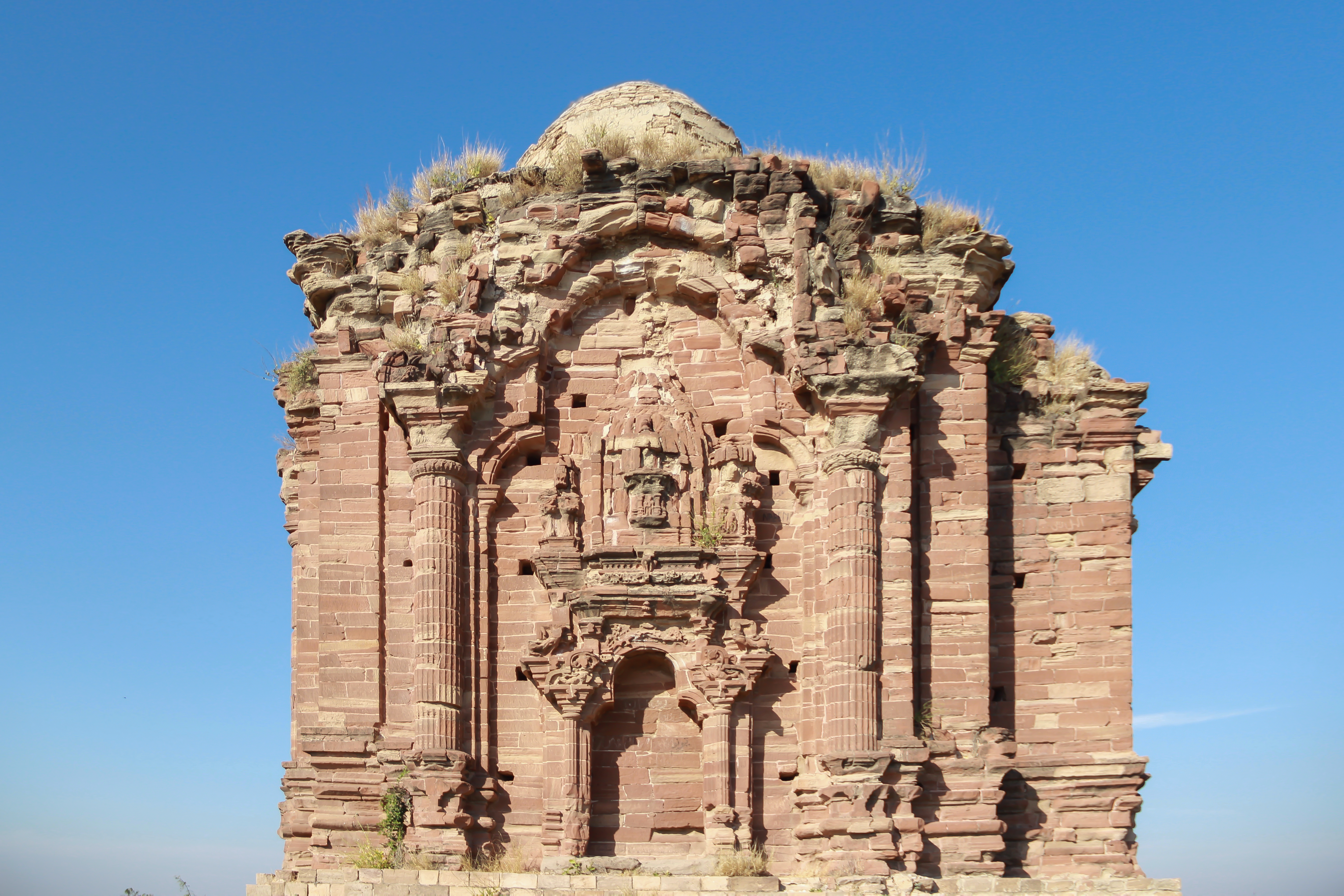
- Top: Katas Raj Temples; Bottom: Neela Wahn Waterfall, Malot Fort

- Chakwal is located in the north of Punjab.
- Coordinates: 33°40′38″N 72°51′21″E
- Country: Pakistan
- Province: Punjab
- Division: Rawalpindi
- Headquarters: Chakwal
- Tehsils (3): List: Chakwal; Kallar Kahar; Choa Saidan Shah

Government
  - Type: District Administration
  - Deputy Commissioner: Sarah Hayat
  - District Police Officer: Ahmed Mohiyuddin
  - District Health Officer: Dr. Muhammad Saeed

Area
  - District of Punjab: 3,593 km^{2} (1,387 sq mi)

Population (2023)
  - District of Punjab: 1,132,608
  - Density: 315.2/km^{2} (816.4/sq mi)
  - Urban: 25.06%
  - Rural: 74.94%

Literacy
  - Literacy rate: Total: (77.79%); Male: (86.00%); Female: (73.07%)
- Time zone: UTC+5 (PST)
- Area code: 0543
- Website: chakwal.punjab.gov.pk

Chakwal District (Punjabi, Urdu: ضلع چکوال, romanized: Zilā' Cakvāl) is a district within the Rawalpindi Division of Punjab, Pakistan. It is located on the Pothohar Plateau in northwestern Punjab, bordered by the districts: Talagang to its west, Rawalpindi to its northeast, Jhelum to its east, Khushab to its west. It was created out of parts of Jhelum and Attock districts in 1985.

== History ==
During British rule, Chakwal was a tehsil of Jhelum district. The population, according to the 1891 census of India, was 164,912, which had fallen to 160,316 in 1901. It contained the towns of Chakwal and Bhaun and 248 villages. The land revenue and cesses amounted in 1903-4 to 3–300,000. The predominantly Muslim population supported the All-India Muslim League and the Pakistan Movement. After the independence of Pakistan in 1947, the minority Hindus and Sikhs migrated to India. It was upgraded to a District on 1 July 1985.

== Administrative divisions ==
The district of Chakwal, which covers an area of 6,524 km^{2}, is subdivided into five tehsils. These tehsils were formerly part of neighbouring districts:

- Chakwal Tehsil was annexed from Jhelum District and made part of the newly formed Chakwal District.
- Choa Saidan Shah was carved out of sub-division Pind Dadan Khan of Jhelum District and was amalgamated with sub-division Chakwal. Choa Saidan Shah was upgraded to the level of a sub-division in 1993.

Now the district is administratively subdivided into five tehsils and 45 union councils. The district Talagang has been recognized as a separate by department of revenue with tehsil Lawa and tehsil Talagang, but it is still non-functional.

Name of tehsil	No. of union councils	No. of villages	No. of public schools	No. of police stations	No. of post offices
Chakwal	30	207	485	5	48
Choa Saidan Shah	7	47	93	1	14
Kallar Kahar	8	72	146	1	15
Total	45	326	1140	7	77

== Administration ==
#	Tehsil	Area (km²)	Pop. (2023)	Density (ppl/km²) (2023)	Lit. Rate (%Male)	Lit. Rate (%Female)	Lit. Rate (Overall) (2023)	Union Councils
1	Chakwal	2,167	768,622	354.69	85.91%	73.58%	79.63%	30
2	Choa Saidan Shah	473	167,537	354.20	86.21%	72.08%	79.28%	7
3	Kallar Kahar	953	196,449	206.14	86.15%	71.84%	79.23%	8
	Total	3,593	1,132,608	305.01	86.09%	72.50%	79.38%	45

== Constituencies ==
There is one district council, one municipal committees — Chakwal — and two town committees — Choa Saidan Shah and Kallar Kahar.

The district is represented in the National Assembly by two constituencies: NA-60 and NA-61. The district is represented in the provincial assembly by four elected MPAs and in National Assembly by two MNAs who represent the following constituencies:

Constituency	MPA	Party
(PP-20)	Sultan Haider Ali Khan	Pakistan Muslim League (N)
(PP-21)	Malik Taveer Aslam	Pakistan Muslim League (N)
(PP-22)	Malik Falk Sher Awan	Pakistan Muslim League (N)
(PP-23)	Malik Sheryar Awan	Pakistan Muslim League (N)
(NA-58)	Mjr. (Rtd.) Tahir Iqbal Malik	Pakistan Muslim League (N)
(NA-59)	Sardar Ghulam Abbas	Pakistan Muslim League (N)

== Geography ==
Chakwal district borders the districts of Rawalpindi and Attock in the north, Jhelum in the east, Khushab in the south and Mianwali in the west. The total area of Chakwal district is 6,609 square kilometres, which is equivalent to 1,652,443 acres (6,687.20 km^{2}).

The southern portion runs up into the Salt Range and includes the Chail peak, 3,701 feet (1,128 m) above the sea, the highest point in the district. Between this and the Sohan river, which follows more or less the northern boundary, the country consists of what was once a fairly level plain, sloping down from 2,000 feet (610 m) at the foot of the hills to 1,400 feet (430 m) in the neighbourhood of the Sohan; the surface is now much cut up by ravines and is very difficult to travel over.

== Demographics ==
Historical population
Year	Pop.	±% p.a.
1951	...	—
1961	...	—
1972	...	—
1981	...	—
1998	1,083,725	—
2017	1,495,463	+1.71%
2023	1,734,854	+2.51%
Sources: Includes Talagang and Lawa tehsils which have since become a separate district.

As of the 2023 census, residual Chakwal district has 187,476 households and a population of 1,132,608. The district has a sex ratio of 99.23 males to 100 females and a literacy rate of 77.79%: 86.12% for males and 69.52% for females and stands out as 5th highest literate district in Punjab and 11th in Pakistan. As per census 2023, the district has 60,787 out of school children (OOSC). 266,804 (23.62% of the surveyed population) are under 10 years of age. 334,755 (29.56%) live in urban areas. All over Pakistan, the district Chakwal has least (9%) OOSC with highest NER in Matric (49%) and highest GER in Matric (95%)

Muslims formed the overwhelming majority at 1,722,147 (99.37%) while 0.63% of the population were from religious minorities, mainly Christians, who mostly live in Chakwal town.

Religion in Chakwal district (2023)
Religion	Percent
Islam	99.37%
Christianity	0.55%
Other or not stated	0.08%

Religion in contemporary Chakwal District
Religious group	1941		2017		2023	
Religious group	Pop.	%	Pop.	%	Pop.	%
Islam	235,571	89.44%	963,584	99.57%	1,122,282	99.37%
Sikhism	14,161	5.38%	—N/a	—N/a	24	~0%
Hinduism (Note: 1931-1941: Including Ad-Dharmis)	13,587	5.16%	132	0.01%	117	0.01%
Christianity	53	0.02%	3,074	0.32%	6,212	0.55%
Ahmadi	—N/a	—N/a	905	0.10%	768	0.07%
Others	15	~0%	12	~0%	40	~0%
Total Population	263,387	100%	967,707	100%	1,129,443	100%
Note: 1941 census data is for Chakwal and part of Pind Dadan Khan tehsil of Jhelum district, which roughly corresponds to contemporary Chakwal district. Figures for contemporary Choa Saidan Shah were taken from the current ratio of the current population of the tehsil to the current population of undivided Pind Dadan Khan tehsil. Proportion of religions in rural areas was assumed to be homogenous. District and tehsil borders have changed since 1941.

Languages of Chakwal district (2023)
1. Punjabi (89.9%)
2. Pashto (7.01%)
3. Urdu (2.15%)
4. Others (0.91%)

At the time of the 2023 census, 89.93% of the population spoke Punjabi, 7.01% Pashto and 2.15% Urdu as their first language.

The local Punjabi dialects are Dhani and Awankari.

== Education ==
Chakwal has a total of 1,140 government schools out of which 52.63% (600 schools) are for female students. The district has an enrollment of 181,574 in public sector schools.

== Educational institutions ==
Educational institutions in the Chakwal District include:

- Government Post Graduate College (Chakwal)
- University Of Chakwal

== Notable people ==
- Yahya Khan, former President of Pakistan, was born in Chakwal city in 1917.
- Manmohan Singh, the Prime Minister of India from 2004-2014, was born in Gah village (formerly part of Jhelum District)
- Khudadad Khan VC, British Indian Army, operated a machine gun despite being wounded after his team was overrun and bayoneted by the Germans, holding them back long enough for reinforcements in the Western Front
- Nur Khan, was a three-star air officer, politician, sports administrator, and the Commander-in-Chief of the Pakistan Air Force, serving under President Ayub Khan from 1965 until 1969.
- Tajammul Hussain Malik, War Hero of the Indo-Pakistani War of 1965, held an impenetrable defence in the Battle of Hilli against a multiple times larger force and famously refused to surrender vowing to fight till the end
- Muhammad Safdar, Lt. General Muhammad Safdar is the former Governor of Punjab, having served from 1999 to 2001. He has also previously served as the ambassador to Morocco and the Vice-Chancellor of the University of Punjab until 1993.
- Colonel Imam – Brigadier Sultan Amir Tarar was a one-star rank army general in the Pakistan Army, member of the Special Service Group (SSG) of the army, and an intelligence officer of the Inter-Services Intelligence (ISI).
- Rafiuddin Hashmi, an Iqbalist, researcher, travel writer and a professor in Oriental College, and the University of the Punjab

== See also ==
- Chakwal
- Rawalpindi Division
- Chakwal railway station
- Kalas Shair Khan
- North Western State Railway
- Districts of Pakistan
- Punjab, Pakistan
- Mandra–Bhaun Railway
- Swaik Lake (Khandowa Lake)

== Bibliography ==
- University of Engineering and Technology. Centre of Excellence in Water Resources Engineering; Pakistan Science Foundation (1979), National Seminar on Land and Water Resources Development of Barani Areas, [July 21-24, 1979], The University of Wisconsin, ISBN 978-01-9023-806-3
