= Chaudhry Zafar Iqbal =

Pakistani politician

Member of the Provincial Assembly of the Punjab
- In office 15 August 2018 – 14 January 2023
- Constituency: PP-26 Jhelum-II

Personal details
- Party: PTI (2018-present)

Chaudhry Zafar Iqbal is a Pakistani politician who had been a member of the Provincial Assembly of the Punjab from August 2018 till January 2023. He defeated Chaudhry Lal Hussain of the Pakistan Muslim League (N) from Jhelum.

== Political career ==
He was elected to the Provincial Assembly of the Punjab as a candidate of the Pakistan Tehreek-e-Insaf (PTI) from PP-26 Jhelum-II in the 2018 Punjab provincial election. He defeated Chaudhry Lal Hussain, a candidate of the Pakistan Muslim League (N) (PML(N)).

He is running for a seat in the Provincial Assembly from PP-26 Jhelum-II as a candidate of the PTI in the 2023 Punjab provincial election.

He was arrested by police under Section 16 of the Maintenance of Public Order (MPO) on 25 July 2023.
