= Chaudhry Lal Hussain =

Pakistani politician

Member of the Provincial Assembly of the Punjab
- In office 29 May 2013 – 31 May 2018
- Constituency: PP-26 Jhelum-III

Personal details
- Born: 23 October 1941 (age 85) Jhelum
- Party: Pakistan Muslim League (Nawaz)

Chaudhry Lal Hussain (born 23 October 1941) is a Pakistani politician who was a Member of the Provincial Assembly of the Punjab from May 2013 to May 2018.

== Early life and education ==
He was born on 23 October 1941 in Jhelum.

He has completed matriculation education.

== Political career ==
He was elected to the Provincial Assembly of the Punjab as a candidate of the Pakistan Muslim League (N) (PML(N)) from PP-26 Jhelum-III in the 2013 Punjab provincial election.

He contested the 2018 Punjab provincial election from PP-26 Jhelum-II as a candidate of the PML(N) but was unsuccessful and lost to Chaudhry Zafar Iqbal, a candidate of the Pakistan Tehreek-e-Insaf (PTI).
