= PP-28 Gujrat-II =

Constituency of the Punjabi Provincial Legislature, Pakistan

- Constituency for the Provincial Assembly of Punjab
- Region: Kharian Tehsil (partly) in Gujrat District

Current constituency
- Created: 2023
- Created from: PP-115 Gujrat-VIII (2002-2018); PP-28 Gujrat-II (2023-)

PP-28 Gujrat-II is a Constituency of Provincial Assembly of Punjab.It was abolished in 2018 delimitations and when Gujrat District lost 1 seat after 2017 Census. It was created again after 2023 delimitations.

== General elections 2024 ==
Provincial election 2024: PP-28 Gujrat-II
Party	Candidate	Votes	%	±%
Independent	Shahid Raza (Note: Filed nomination papers as PTI candidate but ECP allowed him to run as an Independent)	48,271	42.62	
PML(N)	Shabir Ahmad	35,268	31.14	
TLP	Yasar Altaf	10,942	9.66	
PML(Q)	Naeem Raza	9,659	8.53	
JI	Taria Saleem	4,284	3.78	
Others	Others (sixteen candidates)	4,848	4.27	
Turnout		115,979	41.27	
Total valid votes		113,272	97.67	
Rejected ballots		2,707	2.33	
Majority		13,003	11.48	
Registered electors		281,005		
hold				

== General elections 2013 ==
General elections were held on 11 May 2013. Chuhdary Shabir Ahmed kotla of Pakistan Muslim league N won by 42562 votes. And Runner up candidate was Naeem Raza kotla of PML-Q 24322. And PTI candidate was on 3rd with 20893 votes.

Provincial election 2013 : PP-115 Gujrat-ViII
Party	Candidate	Votes	%	±%
PML(N)	Ch. Shabir Ahmed	42,562	45.76	
PML(Q)	Naeem Raza Kotla	24,322	26.15	
PTI	Nasir Ahmed Chappar	20,893	22.46	
JI	Syed Ziaullah Shah	4,363	4.69	
Others	Others (nineteen candidates)	879	0.95	
Turnout		94,990	51.21	
Total valid votes		93,019	97.93	
Rejected ballots		1,971	2.07	
Majority		18,240	19.61	
Registered electors		185,482		
hold				

== General elections 2008 ==
Provincial election 2008 : PP-115 Gujrat-ViII
Party	Candidate	Votes	%	±%
Independent	Ch. Irfan ud Din Ahmad	24,756	35.01	
PML(Q)	Ch. Muhamad Naseer Abbas	23,761	33.60	
PML(N)	Ch. Nasir Ahmad Chupar	13,519	19.12	
PPP	Ch. Waqas Ijaz	7,691	10.88	
Independent	Ch. Shamshad Ali Advocate	562	0.79	
Independent	Aamar Usman Adil	243	0.34	
Independent	Muhammad Anwar Malik	105	0.15	
Independent	Ch. Muhammad Ashraf	54	0.08	
Independent	Major (R) Tariq Javed Akhtar	14	0.02	
Independent	Lt. Col (R) Zafar Iqbal Ch	8	0.01	
Turnout		74,402	51.24	
Total valid votes		70,713	95.04	
Rejected ballots		3,689	4.96	
Majority		995	1.41	
Registered electors		145,199		

== See also ==
- PP-27 Gujrat-I
- PP-29 Gujrat-III
