= PP-29 Gujrat-III =

Constituency of the Punjabi Provincial Legislature, Pakistan

- Constituency for the Provincial Assembly of Punjab
- Region: Jalalpur Jattan Tehsil (partly) in Gujrat District

Current constituency
- Member: Khalid Javed Asghar Ghural
- Created from: PP-108 Gujrat-I (2002-2018); PP-28 Gujrat-I (2018-2023)

PP-29 Gujrat-III (پی پی-29، گجرات-3) is a Constituency of Provincial Assembly of Punjab.

== General elections 2024 ==
Provincial election 2024: PP-29 Gujrat-III
Party	Candidate	Votes	%	±%
PML(Q)	Khalid Javed Asghar Ghural	45,142	32.30	
PML(N)	Nawabzada Haider Mehdi	35,096	25.11	
Independent	Afia Noreen (Note: Filed nomination papers as PTI candidate but ECP allowed him to run as an Independent)	33,990	24.32	
TLP	Muhammad Mehmood Qadri	17,806	12.74	
JI	Shahbaz Ahmad Chaudhary	2,743	1.96	
Independent	Fakhar Zaman	2,263	1.62	
Others	Others (ten candidates)	2,738	1.95	
Turnout		143,312	54.06	
Total valid votes		139,778	97.53	
Rejected ballots		3,534	2.47	
Majority		10,046	7.19	
Registered electors		265,114		
hold				

== 2018 Elections ==
General elections are scheduled to be held on 25 July 2018.

Provincial election 2018: PP-28 Gujrat-I
Party	Candidate	Votes	%	±%
PML(Q)	Shujahat Nawaz	56,484	41.03	
PML(N)	Nawabzada Haider Mahdi	41,470	30.13	
TLP	Hafiz Muhammad Farukh Nadeem	32,656	23.72	
Independent	Zaheer Akhter	1,671	1.21	
PPP	Muhammad Rafique Khatana	1,627	1.18	
Others	Others (six candidates)	3,750	2.73	
Turnout		141,640	54.97	
Total valid votes		137,658	97.19	
Rejected ballots		3,982	2.81	
Majority		15,014	10.90	
Registered electors		257,657		

== 2013 Elections ==
Provincial election 2013: PP-108 Gujrat-I
Party	Candidate	Votes	%	±%
PML(N)	Nawabzada Haider Mehdi	32,310	32.30	
PML(Q)	Shajahat Nawab	29,492	29.48	
Independent	Ch. Zubair Ahmad Khan	11,063	11.06	
Independent	Ch. Naveed Asghar Jungle	9,831	9.83	
Independent	Ch. Muhammad Ali Gujjar	6,843	6.84	
PTI	Abdul Hameed Butt	5,662	5.66	
Independent	Khurshid Alam Chaudhry	1,977	1.98	
JI	Ch. Riaz Ahmed	1,216	1.22	
Others	Others (eighteen candidates)	1,653	1.65	
Turnout		104,837	57.78	
Total valid votes		100,047	95.43	
Rejected ballots		4,790	4.57	
Majority		2,818	2.82	
Registered electors		181,438		

== 2008 Elections ==
Provincial election 2008: PP-108 Gujrat-I
Party	Candidate	Votes	%	±%
PML(Q)	Khalid Javed Asghar Ghural	46,765	54.10	
PPP	Nawabzada Muzaffar Ali Khan	23,338	27.00	
Independent	Muhammad Ashraf	8,403	9.72	
PML(N)	Shabbir Ahmed	7,290	8.43	
Independent	Sheraz Ahmad	382	0.44	
Independent	Sajjad Ahmad Sajid	261	0.30	
Turnout		89,302	59.28	
Total valid votes		86,439	96.79	
Rejected ballots		2,863	3.21	
Majority		23,427	27.10	
Registered electors		150,656		

== See also ==
- PP-28 Gujrat-II
- PP-30 Gujrat-IV
