= Tanveer Aslam Malik =

Pakistani politician (born 1972)

Member of the Provincial Assembly of the Punjab
- In office 15 August 2018 – 14 January 2023
- Constituency: PP-22 Chakwal-II
- In office 2002 – 31 May 2018
- Constituency: PP-21 (Chakwal-II)

Personal details
- Born: 10 June 1972 (age 54) Lahore, Punjab, Pakistan
- Party: Pakistan Muslim League (N) (2008–present)

Punjab Assembly Lahore

Tanveer Aslam Malik is a Pakistani politician who had been a member of the Provincial Assembly of the Punjab from August 2018 till January 2023. Previously he was a member of the Punjab Assembly from 2002 to May 2018.

== Early life and education ==
He was born on 10 June 1972 in Lahore.

He has a degree of Bachelor of Commerce which he obtained in 1992 from University of Karachi and has a degree of Master of Business Administration in Marketing which he received in 1995 from Southeastern University.

== Political career ==
He was elected to the Provincial Assembly of the Punjab as a candidate of Pakistan Muslim League (Q) (PML-Q) from Constituency PP-21 (Chakwal-II) in the 2002 Pakistani general election. He received 35,698 votes and defeated Shaukat Hussain Shah, a candidate of Pakistan Muslim League (N) (PML-N).

He was re-elected to the Provincial Assembly of the Punjab as a candidate of PML-N from Constituency PP-21 (Chakwal-II) in the 2008 Pakistani general election. He received 57,463 votes and defeated Shaukat Hussain Shah, a candidate of PML-Q.

He was re-elected to the Provincial Assembly of the Punjab as a candidate of PML-N from Constituency PP-21 (Chakwal-II) in the 2013 Pakistani general election. In June 2013, he was inducted into the provincial cabinet of Chief Minister Shahbaz Sharif and was made Provincial Minister of Punjab for Housing, Urban Development and Public Health Engineering. He remained Minister for Housing, Urban Development and Public Health Engineering until November 2016. In a cabinet reshuffle in November 2016, he was appointed Provincial Minister of Punjab for Communication and Works.

He was re-elected to Provincial Assembly of the Punjab as a candidate of PML-N from Constituency PP-22 (Chakwal-II) in the 2018 Pakistani general election.
