= PP-27 Gujrat-I =

Constituency of the Punjabi Provincial Legislature, Pakistan

- Constituency for the Provincial Assembly of Punjab
- Region: Sarai Alamgir Tehsil, Kharian city and cantonment of Kharian Tehsil in Gujrat District

Current constituency
- Created from: PP-114 Gujrat-VII (2002-2018); PP-34 Gujrat-VII (2018-2023)

PP-27 Gujrat-I (پی پی-27، گجرات-1) is a Constituency of Provincial Assembly of Punjab.

== General elections 2024 ==
Provincial election 2024: PP-27 Gujrat-I
Party	Candidate	Votes	%	±%
PML(Q)	Raja Muhammad Aslam Khan	34,754	30.28	
Independent	Nouman Ashraf Chaudhary (Note: Filed nomination papers as PTI candidate but ECP allowed him to run as an Independent)	30,305	26.41	
PML(N)	Muhammad Hanif Malik	27,867	24.28	
TLP	Muhammad Afzal	13,994	12.19	
PMML	Ikram Raza	3,278	2.86	
JI	Ali Raza Waheed	3,102	2.70	
Others	Others (thirteen candidates)	1,465	1.28	
Turnout		117,233	46.64	
Total valid votes		114,765	97.89	
Rejected ballots		2,468	2.11	
Majority		4,449	3.87	
Registered electors		251,347		
hold				

== General elections 2018 ==
Provincial election 2018: PP-34 Gujrat-VII
Party	Candidate	Votes	%	±%
PTI	Muhammad Arshad Chaudhary	58,211	37.78	
PML(N)	Raja Muhammad Aslam Khan	50,632	32.86	
TLP	Syed Shamim Raza	25,667	16.66	
Independent	Naeem Raza Kotla	11,077	7.19	
MMA	Manazar Hussain	3,400	2.21	
AAT	Sikandar Azam	1,589	1.03	
Independent	Malik Ali Asgher Awan	1,167	0.76	
PPP	Ehsan UI Haq	1,022	0.66	
Others	Others (six candidates)	1,331	0.87	
Turnout		157,580	52.57	
Total valid votes		154,096	97.79	
Rejected ballots		3,484	2.21	
Majority		7,579	4.92	
Registered electors		299,781		

== General elections 2013 ==
Provincial election 2013: PP-114 Gujrat-VII
Party	Candidate	Votes	%	±%
PML(N)	Malik Muhammad Hanif Awan	40,428	35.27	
PTI	Raja Muhammad Naeem Nawaz	32,795	28.61	
PML(Q)	Chaudhary Muhammad Arshad	28,399	24.78	
Independent	Chaudhary Gulzar Ahmed Saang Number Daraan	6,517	5.69	
Independent	Chaudhary Muhammad Tariq	2,573	2.25	
JI	Muhammad Akhtar	1,574	1.37	
Independent	Malik Ali Asghar Awan	1,054	0.92	
Others	Others (fifteen candidates)	1,273	1.11	
Turnout		117,192	52.57	
Total valid votes		114,613	97.80	
Rejected ballots		2,579	2.20	
Majority		7,633	6.66	
Registered electors		214,140		

== General elections 2008 ==
Provincial election 2008: PP-114 Gujrat-VII
Party	Candidate	Votes	%	±%
PML(Q)	Ch. Muhammad Arshad	44,234	47.62	
PML(N)	Raja Naeem Nawaz	28,833	31.04	
Independent	Muhammad Ilyas Ch.	11,139	11.99	
PPP	Naeem Aslam Chaudhry	8,360	9.00	
Independent	Ali Asghar	226	0.24	
Independent	Noman Ashraf	45	0.05	
Independent	Sumaira Khalid Chaudhry	26	0.03	
Independent	Ch. Ayyaz Ahmad	25	0.03	
Turnout		95,172	54.04	
Total valid votes		92,888	97.60	
Rejected ballots		2,284	2.40	
Majority		15,401	16.58	
Registered electors		176,105		

== See also ==
- PP-26 Jhelum-III
- PP-28 Gujrat-II
