= Sultan Haider Ali Khan =

Pakistani politician

Member of the Provincial Assembly of Punjab
- Incumbent
- Assumed office 24 February 2024

Personal details
- Party: PMLN (2018-present)

Sultan Haider Ali Khan is a Pakistani politician who has been a Member of the Provincial Assembly of the Punjab since 2024.

== Political career ==
In a by-election held in January 2018, Khan secured a seat in the Provincial Assembly of the Punjab as a candidate of Pakistan Muslim League (N) (PML-N) from constituency PP-20 Chakwal-I. He received 75,934 votes, defeating Raja Tariq Mehmood Afzal of Pakistan Tehreek-e-Insaf (PTI), who secured 46,025 votes. This election followed the passing of Khan's father, Chaudhry Liaquat Ali Khan.

He was re-elected to the Provincial Assembly of the Punjab as a candidate of PML-N from Constituency PP-20 (Chakwal-I) in the 2024 Pakistani general election.
