= Sardar Mumtaz Khan =

Pakistani politician

Sardar Mumtaz Khan Tamman
- سردارممتاز خان ٹمن

Member of the National Assembly of Pakistan
- In office October 2010 – 31 May 2018
- Constituency: NA-61 (Chakwal-II)
- In office 1993–1996
- Constituency: NA-44 (Chakwal-II)

Personal details
- Born: 26 May 1939 (age 87)
- Party: Pakistan Muslim League (N)

Sardar Mumtaz Khan Tamman (Urdu: سردار ممتاز ٹمن; born 26 May 1939) is a Pakistani politician who had been a member of the National Assembly of Pakistan, from 1993 to 1996 and again from October 2010 to May 2018.

== Early life ==
He was born on 26 May 1939.

== Political career ==
He was elected to the National Assembly of Pakistan as a candidate for Pakistan Peoples Party for Constituency NA-44 (Chakwal-II) in the 1993 Pakistani general election. He received 77,185 votes and defeated Sardar Mansoor Hayat Tamman of IJI.

He was re-elected to the National Assembly as a candidate for Pakistan Muslim League (N) (PML-N) for Constituency NA-61 (Chakwal-II) in by-elections held in October 2010. He received 92,714 votes and defeated an independent candidate, Mansoor Hayat Tamman. The seat became vacant after the disqualification of Sardar Faiz Tamman who was elected in the 2008 Pakistani general election.

He was re-elected to the National Assembly as a candidate for PML-N for Constituency NA-61 (Chakwal-II) in the 2013 Pakistani general election. He received 114,282 votes and defeated Chaudhry Pervaiz Elahi.

He was offered PML-Q ticket to contest the 2018 general election from Constituency NA-65 (Chakwal-II) which Tamman declined.
