= Raja Yawar Kamal Khan =

Pakistani politician

Member of the Provincial Assembly of the Punjab
- In office 15 August 2018 – 14 January 2023
- Constituency: PP-25 Jhelum-I

Personal details
- Party: INDEPENDENT (2025-present)
- Other political affiliations: IPP (2023-2025); PTI (2018-2023)

Raja Yawar Kamal Khan is a Pakistani politician who had been a member of the Provincial Assembly of the Punjab from August 2018 till January 2023.

== Political career ==
He was elected to the Provincial Assembly of the Punjab as a candidate of Pakistan Tehreek-e-Insaf from Constituency PP-25 (Jhelum-I) in the 2018 Pakistani general election.
