= Kalas Shair Khan =

Coordinates: 33°29′20″N 72°57′23″E

Kalas Shair Khan (commonly written and spoken as "Kalas") is a village situated on the border of three districts (Jhelum, Rawalpindi, and Chakwal) in Pakistan. The village is included in District and Tehsil Chakwal, a recently annexed district of Jhelum.

== Etymology ==
Kalas comes from the name of the caste of the people (kalis gujjar) who live in this village and the surrounding areas.

== Economy ==
Over 85% of the population is engaged in agriculture, mostly subsistence. Kalas is a semi-arid area with a shortage of irrigation systems and water sources for agriculture. The population is dependent on rainfall as no river flows nearby. Most of the cultivable lands are owned by the Gujjar's.

Crops grown in the village include Wheat, Maize, Millet, Masoor, gram, and barley.

== Demography ==
As of 2016 the populations was 2700. Kalas' literacy rate was estimated to be 68%. The majority of the population has been educated up to matriculation and the intermediate level. Among the younger generation, students study in various cities and abroad. Several female students completed their master's degrees in diverse fields such as administration, statistics, history, biology, education and English. Locally, primary and higher secondary schools are available.

Most students study in nearby towns or cities in private schools or colleges or in government schools.

== Languages ==
Inhabitants speak Punjabi, Urdu and Pothohari dialects of the Punjabi language.

== Development ==
Gas, Electrical lines, television cables, telephone service and Internet access are available.

== Sports ==
Cricket, football (soccer), hockey, volleyball, and neza bazi are popular sports.

== Religion ==
The people follow Sunni Islam and attend the single Mosque there.

== Transport ==
Minibus and Suzuki pick up trucks are used as public transport. Auto rickshaws are used. Bicycles and pickup trucks are popular.
