= Khalid Javed Asghar Ghural =

Pakistani politician

Member of the Provincial Assembly of the Punjab
- Incumbent
- Assumed office 24 February 2024
- Constituency: PP-29 Gujrat-III

Personal details
- Party: PML(Q) (2002-present)

Khalid Javed Asghar Ghural is a Pakistani politician who has been a Member of the Provincial Assembly of the Punjab, since 24 February 2024.

== Early life and education ==
Ghural was born in Gujrat on 7 October 1968. He completed his BA and earned an LL.B. degree from the University of the Punjab, Lahore, in 1993.

== Political career ==
He was elected to the Provincial Assembly of the Punjab as a candidate of Pakistan Muslim League (Q) (PML-Q) from PP-108 (Gujrat-I) in the 2002 Pakistani general election. During his tenure as member of the assembly, he become Parliamentary Secretary for Sports.

He was re-elected to the Provincial Assembly of the Punjab as a candidate of PML-Q from PP-108 (Gujrat-I) for the second time in the 2008 Pakistani general election.

He was unable to secure the party ticket from PML-Q for the 2013 Pakistani general election.

He ran for the seat of the Provincial Assembly of the Punjab from PP-28 (Gujrat-I) as an Independent candidate in the 2018 Pakistani general election but he only received 64 votes and lost the election.

In the 2024 Pakistani general election, Ghural was re-elected to the Provincial Assembly of the Punjab from PP-29 Gujrat-III as a candidate of Pakistan Muslim League (Q) for the third time.
