= PP-26 Jhelum-III =

Constituency of the Punjabi Provincial Legislature, Pakistan

- Constituency for the Provincial Assembly of Punjab
- Region: Jhelum Tehsil (partly) and Pind Dadan Khan Tehsil of Jhelum District

Current constituency
- Created: 1988
- Member: vacant
- Created from: PP 26 Jhelum-III & PP 27 Jhelum IV (2002-2018); PP-27 Jhelum-III (2018-2023)

PP-26 Jhelum-III (پی پی-27، جہلم-3) is a Constituency of Provincial Assembly of Punjab.

== General elections 2024 ==
Provincial election 2024: PP-26 Jhelum-III
Party	Candidate	Votes	%	±%
Independent	Mushtaq Ahmed (Note: Filed nomination papers as PTI candidate but ECP allowed him to run as an Independent)	60,218	38.65	
PML(N)	Nasir Mehmood	54,650	35.08	
TLP	Imran Haidar	17,822	11.44	
PPP	Nazar Hussain	10,869	6.98	
PMML	Muhammad Afzal	2,036	1.31	
Others	Others (sixteen candidates)	10,205	6.54	
Turnout		160,389	46.75	
Total valid votes		155,800	97.14	
Rejected ballots		4,589	2.86	
Majority		5,568	3.57	
Registered electors		343,096		
hold				

== General elections 2018 ==
Provincial election 2018: PP-27 Jhelum-III
Party	Candidate	Votes	%	±%
PTI	Fawad Ahmad	67,444	41.14	
PML(N)	Nasir Mehmood	65,501	39.95	
TLP	Muhammad Farooq	15,216	9.28	
Independent	Mushtaq Ahmed	3,941	2.40	
Independent	Saqib Hamid	2,693	1.64	
Independent	Nawabzada Syed Shamas Haider	2,685	1.64	
PPP	Syed Asif Haider	2,586	1.58	
Independent	Ali Uz Zaman	2,064	1.26	
Others	Others (six candidates)	1,815	1.11	
Turnout		168,515	54.07	
Total valid votes		163,945	97.29	
Rejected ballots		4,570	2.71	
Majority		1,943	1.19	
Registered electors		311,686		

== General elections 2013 ==
Provincial election 2013: PP-26 Jhelum-III
Party	Candidate	Votes	%	±%
PML(N)	Chaudhry Lal Hussain	44,150	50.98	
PTI	Usman Ur Rehman Chowhan	28,653	33.08	
PML(Q)	Muhammad Arif	9,198	10.62	
PPP	Aurangzaib Chaudhry	2,094	2.42	
Others	Others (nine candidates)	2,517	2.90	
Turnout		87,825	50.16	
Total valid votes		86,612	98.62	
Rejected ballots		1,213	1.38	
Majority		15,497	17.90	
Registered electors		175,082		

== General elections 2008 ==
Provincial election 2008: PP-26 Jhelum-III
Party	Candidate	Votes	%	±%
PML(N)	Ch. Nadeem Khadim	37,383	57.62	
PML(Q)	Khan Abdul Qudous Khan	16,487	25.41	
PPP	Pervaiz Akhtar	11,007	16.97	
Turnout		66,197	39.66	
Total valid votes		64,877	98.01	
Rejected ballots		1,320	1.99	
Majority		20,896	32.21	
Registered electors		166,914		

== See also ==
- PP-25 Jhelum-II
- PP-27 Gujrat-I
