= PP-24 Jhelum-I =

Provincial electoral constituency in Punjab, Pakistan

- Constituency for the Provincial Assembly of Punjab
- Region: Sohawa Tehsil and Dina Tehsil (partly) of Jhelum District

Current constituency
- Created from: PP-24 Jhelum-I (2002-2018); PP-25 Jhelum-I (2018-2023)

PP-24 Jhelum-I (پی پی-24، جہلم-1) is a Constituency of Provincial Assembly of Punjab.

== General elections 2024 ==
Provincial election 2024: PP-24 Jhelum-I
Party	Candidate	Votes	%	±%
Independent	Syed Riffat Mehmood (Note: Filed nomination papers as PTI candidate but ECP allowed him to run as an Independent)	55,068	32.96	
IPP	Raja Yawar Kamal Khan	49,810	29.82	
TLP	Syed Irfan Ameer Shah Bukhari	30,054	17.99	
Independent	Syed Zubair Hussain Shah	10,946	6.55	
PPP	Mirza Abdul Ghaffar Khan	4,245	2.54	
JI	Qasim Mehmood	4,176	2.50	
Independent	Yasrab Ali	2,586	1.55	
Others	Others (twenty three candidates)	10,178	6.09	
Turnout		173,026	46.67	
Total valid votes		167,063	96.55	
Rejected ballots		5,963	3.45	
Majority		5,258	3.14	
Registered electors		370,731		
hold				

== General elections 2018 ==
Provincial election 2018: PP-25 Jhelum-I
Party	Candidate	Votes	%	±%
PTI	Raja Yawar Kamal Khan	59,885	35.02	
PML(N)	Mahar Muhammad Fayyaz	56,505	33.04	
TLP	Syed Irfan Ameer Shah Bukhari	27,332	15.98	
Independent	Raja Safeer Akbar	21,292	12.45	
PPP	Mirza Abdul Ghafar Khan	3,472	2.03	
MMA	Qasim Mehmood	1,743	1.02	
Others	Others (four candidates)	790	0.47	
Turnout		177,923	54.58	
Total valid votes		171,019	96.12	
Rejected ballots		6,904	3.88	
Majority		3,380	1.98	
Registered electors		326,000		

== General elections 2013 ==
Provincial election 2013: PP-24 Jhelum-I
Party	Candidate	Votes	%	±%
PML(N)	Raja Muhammad Awais Khan	38,604	38.21	
PTI	Muhammad Taj	27,951	27.67	
Independent	Raja Yawar Kamal Khan	15,895	15.73	
PML(Q)	Abdul Qayyum Choudhry	13,912	13.77	
Others	Others (eleven candidates)	4,663	4.62	
Turnout		104,763	60.07	
Total valid votes		101,025	96.43	
Rejected ballots		3,738	3.57	
Majority		10,653	10.54	
Registered electors		174,407		

== General elections 2008 ==
Ch Muhammad Saqlain succeeded in the election 2008 and became the member of Provincial Assembly.

Provincial election 2008: PP-24 Jhelum-I
Party	Candidate	Votes	%	±%
Independent	Chaudhary Muhammad Saqlain	44,019	52.22	
PML(Q)	Dr. Abdul Qayyum Chaudhary	26,369	31.28	
PPP	Hassan Ahmed Bukhari	9,867	11.71	
Independent	Muhammad Saeed Kiyani	2,288	2.71	
Independent	Raja Muhammad Imtiaz Kayani	1,690	2.01	
Independent	Syed Badar Mustafa	55	0.07	
Turnout		88,226	54.00	
Total valid votes		84,288	95.54	
Rejected ballots		3,938	4.46	
Majority		17,650	20.94	
Registered electors		163,383		

== See also ==
- PP-23 Talagang
- PP-25 Jhelum-II
