= PP-19 Rawalpindi-XIII =

Constituency of the Provincial Assembly of Punjab, Pakistan

- Constituency for the Provincial Assembly of Punjab
- Region: Rawalpindi City (Partly) and Chaklala Cantonment (partly) of Rawalpindi District

Current constituency
- Created from: PP-13 Rawalpindi-XIII (2002-2018); PP-11 Rawalpindi-VI (2018-2023)

PP-19 Rawalpindi-XIII (پی پی-19، راولپنڈى-13) is a Constituency of Provincial Assembly of Punjab.

== 2008—2013: PP-13 Rawalpindi-XIII ==
Provincial election 2008: PP-13 Rawalpindi-XIII
Party	Candidate	Votes	%	±%
PML(N)	Yasir Raza Malik	23,415	46.35	
PPP	Ishtaq Ahmed Mirza	20,486	40.55	
PML(Q)	Ch. Muhammad Adnan	5,894	11.67	
Independent	Sajjad Khan	456	0.90	
MMA	Muhammad Zubair Kayani	153	0.30	
MQM-P	Mounala Muhammad Ayaz	70	0.14	
Independent	Haji Khalid Iqbal Bhatti	27	0.05	
Independent	Malik Izat Mehmand	15	0.03	
Turnout		51,456	35.97	
Total valid votes		50,516	98.17	
Rejected ballots		940	1.83	
Majority		2,929	5.80	
Registered electors		143,050		

== 2013—2018: PP-13 Rawalpindi-XIII ==
General elections were held on 11 May 2013. Muhammad Arif Abbasi won this seat with 33,595 votes.

Provincial election 2013: PP-13 Rawalpindi-XIII
Party	Candidate	Votes	%	±%
PTI	Muhammad Arif Abbasi	33,595	43.73	
PML(N)	Malik Ghulam Raza	30,346	39.50	
PPP	Raja Shahid Mehmood Papu	5,913	7.70	
Independent	Haji Malik Pervez Akhter Awan	2,791	3.63	
JI	Syed Uzair Hamid	2,535	3.30	
Others	Others (twelve candidates)	1,645	2.14	
Turnout		77,507	55.13	
Total valid votes		76,825	99.12	
Rejected ballots		682	0.88	
Majority		3,249	4.23	
Registered electors		140,586		

== 2018—2023: PP-11 Rawalpindi-VI ==
General elections are scheduled to be held on 25 July 2018 Choudhry Muhammad Adnan won this seat with 42,892 votes.

Provincial election 2018: PP-11 Rawalpindi-VI
Party	Candidate	Votes	%	±%
PTI	Chaudhry Muhammad Adnan	42,892	57.87	
PML(N)	Raja Arshad Mehmood	23,838	32.16	
TLP	Malik Azhar Aftab	2,985	4.03	
MMA	Musarat Iqbal Abbasi	1,797	2.42	
PPP	Naeem Aslam Kiyani	1,279	1.73	
Others	Others (five candidates)	1,330	1.80	
Turnout		75,995	46.71	
Total valid votes		74,720	98.32	
Rejected ballots		1,275	1.68	
Majority		19,054	25.71	
Registered electors		162,696		

== 2024 Elections ==
Provincial election 2024: PP-19 Rawalpindi-XIII
Party	Candidate	Votes	%	±%
Independent	Muhammad Tanveer Aslam (Note: Filed nomination papers as PTI candidate but ECP allowed him to run as an Independent)	43,993	56.04	
PML(N)	Haji Pervez Khan	16,768	21.36	
TLP	Malik Fida Hussain	4,475	5.70	
JI	Malik Muhammad Ilyas	3,164	4.03	
Independent	Chaudahry Muhammad Adnan	2,972	3.79	
PPP	Muhammad Iqbal Khan	2,209	2.81	
Others	Others (thirty one candidates)	4,928	6.27	
Turnout		80,010	42.69	
Total valid votes		78,509	98.12	
Rejected ballots		1,501	1.88	
Majority		27,225	34.68	
Registered electors		187,414		
hold				

== See also ==
- PP-18 Rawalpindi-XII
- PP-20 Chakwal-I
