= NA-59 Chakwal-cum-Talagang =

Constituency of the National Assembly of Pakistan

- Constituency for the National Assembly of Pakistan
- Region: Chakwal Tehsil (partly) and Kallar Kahar Tehsil (partly) of Chakwal District (partly) and Talagang District
- Electorate: 553,289

Current constituency
- Party: Pakistan Muslim League (N)
- Member: Sardar Ghulam Abbas
- Created from: NA-61 Chakwal-II

NA-59 Chakwal-cum-Talagang (این اے-59، چکوال-کم-تلہ گنگ) is a constituency for the National Assembly of Pakistan.

It was previously known as (1988–2002) NA-44 Chakwal-II, (2002–2018) NA-61 Chakwal-II and (2018-2022) NA-65 Chakwal-II.

== Members of Parliament ==
=== 1988–2002: NA-44 Chakwal-II ===
Election	Member	Party
1988	Sardar Mansoor Hayat Tamman	IJI
1990	Sardar Mansoor Hayat Tamman	IJI
1993	Sardar Mumtaz Khan Tamman	PPP
1997	Sardar Mansoor Hayat Tamman	PML-N

=== 2002–2018: NA-61 Chakwal-II ===
Election	Member	Party
2002	Muhammad Faiz Malik Tamman	Independent
2008	Muhammad Faiz Malik Tamman	PML-N
2010 by-election	Sardar Mumtaz Khan Tamman	PML-N
2013	Sardar Mumtaz Khan Tamman	PML-N

=== 2018–2023: NA-65 Chakwal-II ===
Election	Member	Party
2018	Parvez Elahi	PML (Q)
By-election 2018	Chaudhry Salik Hussain	PML (Q)

=== 2024–present: NA-59 Chakwal-cum-Talagang ===
Election	Member	Party
2024	Sardar Ghulam Abbas	PML (N)

== Election 2002 ==
General elections were held on 10 October 2002. Muhammad Faiz, an independent candidate, won by 101,664 votes.

General election 2002: NA-61 Chakwal-II
Party	Candidate	Votes	%	±%
Independent	Muhammad Faiz Malik	101,664	52.33	
PML(Q)	Sardar Mansoor Hayat Taman	76,171	39.21	
MMA	Muhammad Amir	9,754	5.02	
PPP	Syed Muhammad Ejaz Shabbir Bukhari	6,671	3.44	
Turnout		198,143	55.26	
Total valid votes		194,260	98.04	
Rejected ballots		3,883	1.96	
Majority		25,493	13.12	
Registered electors		358,593		

== Election 2008 ==
The result of general election 2008 and by-elections on 20 October 2010 in this constituency is given below.

=== Result ===
Muhammad Faiz Tamman succeeded in the election 2008 and Sardar Mumtaz Tamman succeeded in By-elections and became the member of National Assembly.

General election 2008: NA-61 Chakwal-II
Party	Candidate	Votes	%	±%
PML(N)	Muhammad Faiz Tamman	92,201	42.75	
PML(Q)	Parvez Elahi	91,769	42.55	
PPP	Sardar Mansoor Hayat Taman	28,807	13.36	
Independent	Malik Muhammad Irfan Hussain	2,920	1.34	
Turnout		227,093	57.54	
Total valid votes		215,697	94.98	
Rejected ballots		11,396	5.02	
Majority		432	0.20	
Registered electors		394,663		
PML(N) gain from Independent				

== By-Election 2010 ==
Though Faiz Tamman resigned in 2010 due to degree issues. By-elections were conducted in Na-61 on 20 October 2010. There were eight candidates. The front two runners were Sardar Mumtaz Khan Tamman & Sardar Mansoor Hayat Tamman. Mumtaz tamman won the by-elections by a very huge margin and became MNA NA-61.

By-Election 2010: NA-61 Chakwal-II
Party	Candidate	Votes	%	±%
PML(N)	Sardar Mumtaz Khan	104,749	70.33	
Independent	Sardar Mansoor Hayat Tamman	37,986	25.50	
ANP	Kamander (R) Ayub Khan	2,749	1.85	
Independent	Yar Muhammad Yasir Malik	1,177	0.79	
Others	Others (six candidates)	2,286	1.53	
Turnout		152,441	38.59	
Total valid votes		148,947	97.71	
Rejected ballots		3,494	2.29	
Majority		66,763	44.83	
Registered electors		395,039		
PML(N) hold				

== Election 2013 ==
General elections were held on 11 May 2013. Sardar Mumtaz Khan of PML-N won by 114,282 votes by defeating Chaudhry Pervaiz Elahi and became the member of National Assembly.

General election 2013: NA-61 Chakwal-II
Party	Candidate	Votes	%	±%
PML(N)	Sardar Mumtaz Khan	114,282	43.05	
PML(Q)	Parvez Elahi	99,373	37.43	
PTI	Sardar Mansoor Hayat Taman	45,892	17.29	
Others	Others (ten candidates)	5,948	2.33	
Turnout		275,247	62.04	
Total valid votes		265,495	96.46	
Rejected ballots		9,752	3.54	
Majority		14,909	5.62	
Registered electors		443,677		
PML(N) hold				

== Election 2018 ==
General elections were held on 25 July 2018. Chaudhry Pervaiz Elahi of Pakistan Muslim League (Q) won the election but vacated this constituency in favor of speakership of Punjab Assembly.

General election 2018: NA-65 Chakwal-II
Party	Candidate	Votes	%	±%
PML(Q)	Parvez Elahi	157,497	51.31	
PML(N)	Muhammad Faiz Malik	106,081	34.56	
Others	Others (seven candidates)	43,397	14.13	
Turnout		316,882	57.35	
Total valid votes		306,975	96.87	
Rejected ballots		9,907	3.13	
Majority		51,416	16.75	
Registered electors		552,523		
PML(Q) gain from PML(N)				

== By-election 2018 ==
By-elections were held in this constituency on 14 October 2018.

By-election 2018: NA-65 Chakwal-II
Party	Candidate	Votes	%	±%
PML(Q)	Chaudhry Salik Hussain	100,917	74.76	▲23.45
TLP	Muhammad Yaqoob	32,326	23.95	▲16.18
PJDP	Muhammad Amir	1,745	1.29	▲1.02
Turnout		136,965	24.75	▼32.60
Total valid votes		134,988	98.56	▲1.69
Rejected ballots		1,977	1.44	▼1.69
Majority		68,591	50.81	▲34.06
Registered electors		553,289		
PML(Q) hold		Swing	N/A	

== Election 2024 ==
General elections were held on 8 February 2024. Sardar Ghulam Abbas won the election with 135,123 votes.

General election 2024: NA-59 Chakwal-cum-Talagang
Party	Candidate	Votes	%	±%
PML(N)	Sardar Ghulam Abbas	135,123	40.84	N/A
PTI	Muhammad Roman Ahmed (Note: Filed nomination papers as PTI candidate but ECP allowed him to run as an independent)	125,632	37.97	N/A
TLP	Muhammad Yaqub	30,246	9.14	▼14.81
PPP	Hassan Sardar	12,035	3.64	N/A
Others	Others (seventeen candidates)	27,838	8.41	
Turnout		338,774	55.73	▲30.98
Total valid votes		330,874	97.67	
Rejected ballots		7,870	2.33	
Majority		9,491	2.96	
Registered electors		607,840		
PML(N) gain from PTI				

== See also ==
- NA-58 Chakwal
- NA-60 Jhelum-I
