= Sardar Ghulam Abbas =

Member of the National Assembly of Pakistan
- Incumbent
- Assumed office February 2024
- Constituency: NA-59 Chakwal-cum-Talagang

District Nazim of Chakwal District
- In office 2001–2009
- Constituency: Chakwal District

Member Provincial Assembly of Punjab
- In office 1993–1996
- Constituency: PP-18 (Chakwal-I)
- In office 1985–1988
- Constituency: PP-12 (Jhelum)

Personal details
- Born: Jhelum, Punjab, Pakistan
- Party: Pakistan Muslim League (N) (2021–present)
- Other political affiliations: Pakistan Tehreek-e-Insaf (2018–2021); Pakistan Muslim League (N) (2016–2018); Independent (2012-2016); Pakistan Tehreek-e-Insaf (2011–2012); Independent (2009-2011); Pakistan Muslim League (Q) (2001-2009); Pakistan Muslim League (N) (1997–2001); Pakistan Peoples Party (1988–1997)
- Relations: Sardar Aftab Akbar Khan (brother)

Sardar Ghulam Abbas is a Pakistani politician who has been a member of the National Assembly of Pakistan since February 2024. He was a member of the Provincial Assembly of the Punjab, from 1985 to 1988, and then again from 1993 to 1996. Then he became District Nazim of Chakwal, from 2001 to 2009.

== Political career ==
He was elected to the Provincial Assembly of the Punjab from Constituency PP-12 – Jhelum in the 1985 Pakistani general election.

He was again elected to the Provincial Assembly of the Punjab as a candidate of Pakistan Peoples Party from Constituency PP-18 – Chakwal in the 1993 Pakistani general election.

He joined Pakistan Tehreek-e-Insaaf (PTI) in November 2011 but later in 2012 he had quit PTI after developing differences with Imran Khan.

In 2016, he joined Pakistan Muslim League (Nawaz) (PML-N) but had quit in 2018 to join PTI before elections.

In 2018, he rejoined Pakistan Tehreek-e-Insaaf (PTI).

As District Nazim

During his tenure as District Nazim of Chakwal (elected twice under the local government system, approximately 2001–2009), Sardar Ghulam Abbas claimed a record number of development projects were initiated in the district, often with support from President Pervez Musharraf as he was a close aide during that era. Key initiatives included the Sui gas supply project to Dhudial (Rs290 million investment, inaugurated in 2007), infrastructure improvements such as roads and small dams for irrigation in the arid region, urban sewerage schemes (e.g., planned for Chakwal city at Rs184 million), agricultural support through the purchase of tractors and implements for farmers, and the foundation-laying of sports facilities like the Chakwal Sports Complex (on 204 kanals of land, with Rs83 million allocated, intended for completion by 2009). However, some of these projects faced significant delays or remained incomplete years after his tenure, including the sports complex (still unfinished after over a decade in some reports), sewerage systems, and other infrastructure efforts, leading to criticism of long-term execution despite initial momentum. And he was given the title of “Mohsin-e-Chakwal” (محسنِ چکوال) for his work.

2015/2016 local body Elections

In the 2015 Punjab local government elections (with results carrying into 2016), Sardar Ghulam Abbas’s independent group performed strongly in Chakwal district, securing 33 out of 68 union council chairmen seats—outperforming PML-N (which won 28 seats) and PTI (5 seats). His faction also captured several municipal committees, including Talagang, Choa Saidan Shah, Kallar Kahar, and Lawa, while PML-N retained Chakwal municipality. This success highlighted his enduring local influence despite no formal nazim role post-2009. Following these elections, he shared power with PML-N in local arrangements and formally joined the party in September 2016, though the move faced opposition from some PML-N lawmakers in Chakwal who viewed him as a long-time rival.
