= Dhab Pari =

Dhab Pari (ڈہاب پڑی)
- Location within Pakistan
- Coordinates: 33.0035902°N 72.8873347°E
- Country: Pakistan
- Province: Punjab
- District: Chakwal
- Union council: Har Char Dhab

Government
  - UC Chairman: Chaudry Zameer Khan

Area
  - Total: 0.9 km^{2} (0.35 sq mi)
- Elevation: 539 m (1,768 ft)

Population
  - Estimate (2016): 800 people
- Time zone: UTC+5 (PST)
- Postal code: 48801
- Dialling code: 0543

Dhab Pari (ڈہاب پڑی) is a village located in Har Char Dhab union council of Chakwal District in the Punjab Province of Pakistan.

Dhab Pari is located 8 km from Chakwal city and now encompasses Dhoke Sarang Khan, a hamlet with a strong historical background. The hamlet was founded by a man named Chaudhry Sarang Khan in 18th or 19th century.

In 1936, Chaudhry Noor Khan Gandhi (nicknamed after Gandhi), another notable from the area, established the first ever girls school of Jhelum District in Dhab Pari since Chakwal District used to be part of Jhelum district at that time.

== Notable people ==
- Chaudhry Sarang Khan
- Chaudhry Noor Khan Gandhi
