= PP-22 Chakwal-cum-Talagang =

Constituency of the Punjabi Provincial Legislature, Pakistan

- Constituency for the Provincial Assembly of Punjab
- Region: Chakwal District (partly) and Kallar Kahar Tehsil (partly) including Kallar Kahar City of Chakwal District and Talagang Tehsil including Talagang City of Talagang District

Current constituency
- Created from: PP-22 Chakwal-III (2002-2018); PP-23 Chakwal-III (2018-2023)

PP-22 Chakwal-cum-Talagang (پی پی-22،چکوال کم تلہ گنگ) is a Constituency of Provincial Assembly of Punjab.

== General elections 2008 ==
General election 2008: PP-22 Chakwal-III
Party	Candidate	Votes	%	±%
PML(Q)	Khuram Nawab	42,778	39.57	
PML(N)	Pir Nisar Qasim Joji	34,659	32.06	
Independent	Sardar Zulifqar Ali Khan	23,119	21.38	
PPP	Dr. Muhammad Hasnian	7,555	6.99	
Turnout		113,222	58.89	
Total valid votes		108,111	95.49	
Rejected ballots		5,111	4.51	
Majority		8,119	7.51	
Registered electors		192,256		

== General elections 2013 ==
General election 2013 : PP-22 Chakwal-III
Party	Candidate	Votes	%	±%
PML(N)	Zulfiqar Ali Khan	57,235	43.31	
Independent	Sardar Ghulam Abbas	48,984	37.06	
PTI	Pir Syed Nisar Qasim Joji	17,728	13.41	
Independent	Syed Taqi Shah	3,718	2.81	
Others	Others (ten candidates)	4,503	3.41	
Turnout		136,699	63.84	
Total valid votes		132,168	96.69	
Rejected ballots		4,531	3.41	
Majority		8,251	6.25	
Registered electors		214,102		

== General elections 2018 ==
General election 2018: PP-23 Chakwal-III
Party	Candidate	Votes	%	±%
PTI	Sardar Aftab Akbar Khan	78,310	53.60	
PML(N)	Mushtaq Ahmad	45,516	31.15	
TLP	Tanweer Hussain	15,820	10.83	
PPP	Imran Abbas	2,075	1.42	
Independent	Nisar Qasim	1,036	0.71	
Others	Others (five candidates)	3,351	2.30	
Turnout		151,583	56.73	
Total valid votes		146,108	96.39	
Rejected ballots		5,475	3.61	
Majority		32,794	22.45	
Registered electors		267,207		

== General elections 2024 ==
General election 2024: PP-22 Chakwal-cum-Talagang
Party	Candidate	Votes	%	±%
PML(N)	Sardar Ghulam Abbas	61,714	39.80	
Independent	Nisar Ahmed (Note: Filed nomination papers as PTI candidate but ECP allowed him to run as an Independent)	54,077	34.86	
JI	Muhammad Tahir Malik	9,348	6.03	
TLP	Muhammad Idrees	9,113	5.87	
PPP	Muhammad Mazhar Hussain	4,775	3.08	
Independent	Syed Nisar Qasim	1,874	1.21	
Independent	Muhammad Qasim Abbas	1,437	0.93	
Independent	Zohaib Muhammad Khan	1,320	0.85	
PMML	Atif Ali	1,315	0.85	
JUI (F)	Ameer Hamza	1,234	0.79	
Others	Others (twenty candidates)	8,896	5.73	
Turnout		168,215	58.50	
Total valid votes		155,103	92.20	
Rejected ballots		13,112	7.80	
Majority		7,637	4.94	
Registered electors		287,563		
hold				

== By-election 2024 ==
2024 Pakistani by-elections: PP-22 Chakwal-cum-Talagang
Party	Candidate	Votes	%	±%
PML(N)	Malik Falak Sher Awan	58,845	47.88	
SIC	Nisar Ahmed	49,970	40.66	
Independent	Akram Abbas	7,784	6.33	
TLP	Muhammad Idrees	5,741	4.67	
Others	Others (five candidates)	553	0.46	
Turnout		124,297	42.84	
Total valid votes		122,893	98.87	
Rejected ballots		1,404	1.13	
Majority		8,875	7.22	
Registered electors		290,122		
PML(N) hold				

== See also ==
- PP-21 Chakwal-II
- PP-23 Talagang
