= Malik Falak Sher Awan =

Member of the Provincial Assembly of Punjab (2024–2029)

- ملک فلک شیر اعوان

Member of the Provincial Assembly of Punjab
- Incumbent
- Assumed office 29 April 2024
- Constituency: PP-22 Chakwal-cum-Talagang

Personal details
- Party: PMLN (2024-present)

Malik Falak Sher Awan (Urdu: ملک فلک شیر اعوان) is a Pakistani politician who has been a Member of the Provincial Assembly of Punjab, in office since April 2024.

== Political career ==
Awan won the 2024 Pakistani by-elections from PP-22 Chakwal-cum-Talagang as a Pakistan Muslim League (N) candidate. He received 58,845 votes while runner up candidate Nisar Ahmed of Sunni Ittehad Council received 49,970 votes.
