= PP-21 Chakwal-II =

Constituency of the Punjabi Provincial Legislature, Pakistan

- Constituency for the Provincial Assembly of Punjab
- Region: Choa Saidan Shah Tehsil, Chakwal Tehsil (partly) and Kallar Kahar Tehsil (partly) of Chakwal District

Current constituency
- Created from: PP-21 Chakwal-II (2002-2018); PP-22 Chakwal-II (2018-2023)

PP-21 Chakwal-II (پی پی-22، چکوال-2) is a Constituency of Provincial Assembly of Punjab.

== 2008-2013:PP-20 (Chakwal-I) ==
Provincial election 2008: PP-21 Chakwal-II
Party	Candidate	Votes	%	±%
PML(N)	Tanvir Aslam Malik	57,463	48.43	
PML(Q)	Pir Shaukat Hussain Shah	44,175	37.23	
PPP	Malik Asad Nawaz Awan	17,017	14.34	
Turnout		120,756	56.84	
Total valid votes		118,655	98.26	
Rejected ballots		2,101	1.74	
Majority		13,288	11.20	
Registered electors		212,467		

== 2013—2018:PP-21 (Chakwal-II) ==
Provincial election 2013: PP-21 Chakwal-II
Party	Candidate	Votes	%	±%
PML(N)	Tanveer Aslam Malik	75,003	53.06	
Independent	Akhtar Hussain	35,453	25.08	
PTI	Peer Shoukat Hussain Shah	24,472	17.31	
PPP	Raja Asad Raza Janjua	5,302	3.75	
Others	Others (three candidates)	1,134	0.80	
Turnout		145,455	61.72	
Total valid votes		141,364	97.19	
Rejected ballots		4,091	2.81	
Majority		39,550	27.98	
Registered electors		235,685		

== 2018—2023: PP-22 (Chakwal-II) ==
General elections are scheduled to be held on 25 July 2018.

Provincial election 2018: PP-22 Chakwal-II
Party	Candidate	Votes	%	±%
PML(N)	Tanveer Aslam Malik	73,523	45.44	
PTI	Tariq Mehmood Afzal	70,883	43.81	
PPP	Raja Muhammad Rizwan	8,126	5.02	
TLP	Husnain Mehmood Shah	7,082	4.38	
Others	Others (five candidates)	2,181	1.35	
Turnout		166,489	58.10	
Total valid votes		161,795	97.18	
Rejected ballots		4,694	2.82	
Majority		2,640	1.63	
Registered electors		286,566		

== General elections 2024 ==
Provincial election 2024: PP-21 Chakwal-II
Party	Candidate	Votes	%	±%
PML(N)	Tanveer Aslam Malik	79,274	45.26	
Independent	Tariq Mehmood Afzal	68,513	39.12	
TLP	Hafiz Muhammad Umar	15,265	8.72	
PPP	Raja Amjad Noor	8,902	5.08	
Others	Others (seven candidates)	3,192	1.82	
Turnout		179,131	56.12	
Total valid votes		175,146	97.78	
Rejected ballots		3,985	2.22	
Majority		10,761	6.14	
Registered electors		319,170		
hold				

== See also ==
- PP-20 Chakwal-I
- PP-22 Chakwal-cum-Talagang
