= PP-23 Talagang =

Constituency of the Punjabi Provincial Legislature, Pakistan

- Constituency for the Provincial Assembly of Punjab
- Region: Talagang Tehsil (partly) and Lawa Tehsil of Talagang District

Current constituency
- Created from: PP-23 Chakwal-IV (2002-2018); PP-24 Chakwal-IV (2018-2023)

PP-23 Talagang (پی پی-23، تلہ گنگ) is a Constituency of Provincial Assembly of Punjab.

== General elections 2018 ==
Provincial election 2018 : PP-24 Chakwal-IV
Party	Candidate	Votes	%	±%
PML(Q)	Ammar Yasir	81,510	50.03	
PML(N)	Shehryar Malik	63,063	38.70	
TLP	Abdul Ghafoor	9,780	6.00	
Independent	Faisal Shah	5,714	3.51	
MMA	Muhammad Hameed Ullah	1,731	1.06	
Others	Others (two candidates)	1,137	0.70	
Turnout		166,766	58.45	
Total valid votes		162,935	97.70	
Rejected ballots		3,831	2.30	
Majority		18,447	11.33	
Registered electors		285,316		

== General elections 2024 ==
Provincial election 2024: PP-23 Talagang
Party	Candidate	Votes	%	±%
PML(N)	Shahryar Malik	70,649	42.17	
Independent	Sultan Surkhru Awan (Note: Filed nomination papers as PTI candidate but ECP allowed him to run as an Independent)	62,302	37.19	
TLP	Peer Muhammad Shah	12,754	7.61	
Independent	Malik Muhammad Zia UI Haq	7,857	4.69	
PPP	Malik Azmat Hayat	3,495	2.09	
JI	Malik Muhammad Khan	2,994	1.79	
Others	Others (eighteen candidates)	7,483	4.46	
Turnout		173,579	55.03	
Total valid votes		167,534	96.52	
Rejected ballots		6,045	3.48	
Majority		8,347	4.98	
Registered electors		315,424		
hold				

== General elections 2013 ==
Provincial election 2013: PP-23 Chakwal-IV
Party	Candidate	Votes	%	±%
PML(N)	Malik Muhammad Zahoor Anwar	54,949	41.17	
PML(Q)	Sardar Amjad Ilyas Kotehra	46,231	34.64	
PTI	Col. Sultan Surkhro Awan	23,578	17.67	
JI	Dr. Hameed Ullah Malik	4,445	3.33	
MDM	Dr.Shah Nawaz Awan	1,524	1.14	
Others	Others (seven candidates)	2,738	2.05	
Turnout		138,460	60.31	
Total valid votes		133,465	96.39	
Rejected ballots		4,995	3.61	
Majority		8,718	6.53	
Registered electors		229,575		

== General elections 2008 ==
Provincial election 2008: PP-23 Chakwal-IV
Party	Candidate	Votes	%	±%
PML(Q)	Malik Muhammad Zahoor Anwar	45,024	42.41	
PML(N)	Col (R) Sultan Surkhru Awan	41,962	39.52	
PPP	Sardar Dr Maqsood Hayat Tamman	19,190	18.07	
Turnout		113,644	56.15	
Total valid votes		106,176	93.43	
Rejected ballots		7,468	6.57	
Majority		3,062	2.89	
Registered electors		202,407		

== See also ==
- PP-22 Chakwal-cum-Talagang
- PP-24 Jhelum-I
