= PP-20 Chakwal-I =

Constituency of the Provincial Assembly of Punjab, Pakistan

- Constituency for the Provincial Assembly of Punjab
- District: Chakwal Tehsil (partly) including Chakwal city and Kallar Kahar Tehsil (partly) of Chakwal District

Current constituency
- Member: Vacant
- Created from: PP-20 Chakwal-I (2002-2018); PP-21 Chakwal-I (2018-2023)

PP-20 Chakwal-I (پی پی-20، چکوال-1) is a Constituency of Provincial Assembly of Punjab.

== Election 2008 ==
General Election 2008: PP-20 Chakwal-I
Party	Candidate	Votes	%	±%
PML(N)	Iffat Liaqat Ali Khan	50,039	40.27	
PML(Q)	Ijaz Hussain Farhat	42,992	34.60	
PPP	Shah Jahan Sarfaraz Raja	28,062	22.59	
Independent	Eng. Mohammad Ali-i-Imran Syed	2,215	1.78	
Independent	Shaheen Baig	854	0.69	
Independent	Chaudhary Asif Iqba	88	0.07	
Turnout		127,042	57.50	
Total valid votes		124,250	97.80	
Rejected ballots		2,792	2.20	
Majority		7,047	5.67	
Registered electors		220,924		

== Election 2013 ==
General Election 2013: PP-20 (Chakwal-I)
Party	Candidate	Votes	%
PML(N)	Chaudhary Liaqat Ali Khan	62,088	44.30
Independent	Chaudhary Ijaz Hussain Farhat	35,570	25.38
PTI	Chaudhary Ali Nisar Khan Bhatti	32,827	23.42
Others	Others	21,879	6.91
Valid ballots		152,364	97.39
Rejected ballots		4,082	2.61
Turnout		156,446	62.48
Majority		26,518	17.40
PML(N) hold			

== Bye-election 2018 ==
Bye-election 2018: PP-20 (Chakwal-I)
Party	Candidate	Votes	%
PML(N)	Sultan Hiader Ali Khan	75,934	54.69
PTI	Tariq Mehmood Afzal Kalas	46,025	33.15
TLY	Chaudhry Nasir Abbas Minhas	16,112	11.60
Others	Others	773	0.56
Valid ballots		138,844	TBC
Rejected ballots		TBC	TBC
Turnout		TBC	TBC
Majority		29,953	2,334
PML(N) hold			

== 2018—2023: PP-21 (Chakwal-I) ==
General elections are scheduled to be held on 25 July 2018.

Provincial election 2018: PP-21 Chakwal-I
Party	Candidate	Votes	%	±%
PTI	Raja Yassir Humayun Sarfraz	77,528	50.76	
PML(N)	Sultan Haider Ali Khan	65,500	42.89	
TLP	Syed Tassaduq Manzoor	6,483	4.25	
AAT	Muhammad Ayub	2,321	1.52	
Others	Others (four candidates)	895	0.59	
Turnout		155,204	58.69	
Total valid votes		152,727	98.40	
Rejected ballots		2,477	1.60	
Majority		12,028	7.87	
Registered electors		264,445		

== General elections 2024 ==
Provincial election 2024: PP-20 Chakwal-I
Party	Candidate	Votes	%	±%
PML(N)	Sultan Haidar Ali Khan	73,940	45.99	
Independent	Ali Nasir Khan (Note: Filed nomination papers as PTI candidate but ECP allowed him to run as an Independent)	67,234	41.81	
TLP	Shafqat Hussain Malik	8,834	5.49	
PPP	Chauhdary Naushad Ali Khan	4,567	2.84	
Others	Others (fourteen candidates)	6,218	3.87	
Turnout		163,479	58.45	
Total valid votes		160,793	98.36	
Rejected ballots		2,686	1.64	
Majority		6,706	4.18	
Registered electors		279,692		
hold				

== See also ==
- PP-19 Rawalpindi-XIII
- PP-21 Chakwal-II
