= PP-25 Jhelum-II =

Constituency of the Punjabi Provincial Legislature, Pakistan

- Constituency for the Provincial Assembly of Punjab
- Region: Jhelum Tehsil (partly) including Jhelum city and Dina Tehsil (partly) of Jhelum District

Current constituency
- Created from: PP-25 Jhelum-II (2002-2018); PP-26 Jhelum-II (2018-2023)

PP-25 Jhelum-II (پی پی-25، جہلم-2) is a Constituency of Provincial Assembly of Punjab.

== General elections 2024 ==
Provincial election 2024: PP-25 Jhelum-II
Party	Candidate	Votes	%	±%
Independent	Yasir Mehmood Qureshi (Note: Filed nomination papers as PTI candidate but ECP allowed him to run as an Independent)	67,506	48.70	
PML(N)	Chaudhary Nadeem Khadim	40,735	29.39	
TLP	Muhammad Zubair Suleman	11,344	8.18	
Independent	Kashifa Farrukh	7,937	5.73	
PPP	Chaudhary Kashif Islam	2,638	1.90	
Independent	Shaukat Iqbal Mirza	2,165	1.56	
Others	Others (eighteen candidates)	6,295	4.54	
Turnout		143,284	41.82	
Total valid votes		138,620	96.74	
Rejected ballots		4,664	3.26	
Majority		26,771	19.31	
Registered electors		342,653		
hold				

== General elections 2018 ==
Provincial election 2018: PP-26 Jhelum-II
Party	Candidate	Votes	%	±%
PTI	Zafar Iqbal	64,227	44.55	
PML(N)	Chaudhry Lal Hussain	41,679	28.91	
Independent	Chaudhary Saeed Iqbal	14,644	10.16	
TLP	Malik Shoukat Hayat Awan	13,929	9.66	
Independent	Raja Zafar Iqbal	4,801	3.33	
PPP	Chaudhary Kashif Islam	1,876	1.30	
Others	Others (nine candidates)	3,002	2.09	
Turnout		146,746	47.67	
Total valid votes		144,158	98.24	
Rejected ballots		2,588	1.76	
Majority		22,548	15.64	
Registered electors		307,822		

== General elections 2013 ==
Provincial election 2013: PP-25 Jhelum-II
Party	Candidate	Votes	%	±%
PML(N)	Mahar Muhammad Fayyaz	48,594	42.66	
PTI	Abid Hussain	28,146	24.71	
Independent	Zahid Akhtar	12,914	11.34	
PML(Q)	Choudhry Saeed Ahmad	11,306	9.93	
PPP	Chaudhry Tasneem Nasir	5,788	5.08	
Independent	Mughal Muhammad Rafiq	1,824	1.60	
JI	Qasim Mehmood	1,473	1.29	
Others	Others (twelve candidates)	3,862	3.39	
Turnout		117,514	54.65	
Total valid votes		113,907	96.93	
Rejected ballots		3,607	3.07	
Majority		20,448	17.95	
Registered electors		215,044		

== General elections 2008 ==
Provincial election 2008: PP-25 Jhelum-II
Party	Candidate	Votes	%	±%
PML(N)	Muhammad Fayyaz	46,015	48.25	
PML(Q)	Chaudhary Qurban Hussain	29,450	30.88	
PPP	Chaudhary Saeed Ahmed	11,565	12.13	
Independent	Chaudhary Tasneem Nasir	8,200	8.60	
Independent	Chaudhary Muhammad Ashiq	58	0.06	
Independent	Chaudhary Khalique Ahmed Awan	40	0.04	
Independent	Malik Zulfiqar Ali	33	0.03	
Turnout		98,059	47.44	
Total valid votes		95,361	97.25	
Rejected ballots		2,698	2.75	
Majority		16,565	17.37	
Registered electors		206,707		

== See also ==
- PP-24 Jhelum-I
- PP-26 Jhelum-III
