= Kot Suleman =

- Village
- Location within Pakistan
- Country: Pakistan
- Province: Punjab (Pakistan)
- District: Rawalpindi
- Time zone: UTC+5 (PST)

Kot Suleman
Geography
Location	33°07′00″N 73°10′48.60″E
Union Council	Narali
Tehsil	Gujar Khan
District	Rawalpindi
Demographics
Population	250
Ethnicity	Chohan Rajput Gujjar Other
Faith	Muslims - 100%
Local Information
Post Office	Dhoong
Time Zone	PST + 05:00 ahead of GMT
Dialing Code.	0513
Kot Suleman

Kot Suleman (Urdu کو ٹ سيلمان ) is small part of village Dhoong near village Trati in Union Council Narali located in Gujar Khan Tehsil, District Rawalpindi, Punjab, Pakistan. It has a population of 250. Kot Suleman is a historic town of Village Dhoong, Rawalpindi District. Kot Suleman is famous for its natural reserves of oil and natural gas.

== Nearby educational institutions ==
- Government Primary School, Trati
- Government Boys High School, Dhoong
- Government Girls High School, Dhoong
- Al-Hijra Islamic Secondary School, Dhoong
- Dad Public School, Dhoong

== Nearby hospital ==
- Basic Health Unit (Dhoong village)

== Post office ==
- Post Office (Dhoong 47770), General Post Office in Gujar Khan

== Banks and financial institution ==
- Habib Bank Limited (Dhoong Branch)

== Languages ==
- Pothowari and Punjabi are the main languages of Kot Suleman, other languages are Urdu and English.

== Other villages near Kot Suleman ==
- Trati, Dhoong, Ahdi, Narali (Union Council), Daultala, Jatli (Police Station), Dhoke Adra, Dhoke Budhal, Dhoke Cheemian, Dhoke Kanyal, Dhoke Landian, Faryal, Fazolian, Kayal, Thakra Mohra, Mastala, (Langah, Domali, Jand, Chakwal - Chakwal District)

== Transport ==
- Kot Suleman is situated at Daultala – Mulhal Mughlan Road. Gujar Khan is about 18 kilometers, Rawalpindi - Islamabad is about 45 kilometers and Chakwal is about 26 kilometers from Kot Suleman. There are many ways to get around Kot Suleman which Includes public transport, buses, suzukis, van, cars, taxis, auto-rickshaws, motor cycles and tractors etc.
