= Majeed Malik =

Pakistani military officer, politician (1919-2016)

Lieutenant general Abdul Majeed Malik

Minister of Kashmir Affairs & Northern Areas
- In office 11 July 1997 – 12 September 1999
- President: Wasim Sajjad (Acting); Muhammad Rafiq Tarar
- Prime Minister: Nawaz Sharif

Minister of States & Frontier Regions
- In office 11 July 1997 – 12 September 1999

Minister of Petroleum
- In office 11 August 1990 – 6 November 1990
- President: Ghulam Ishaq Khan
- Prime Minister: Ghulam Mustafa Jatoi

Member of National Assembly of Pakistan
- In office 15 February 1997 – 12 October 1999
- Constituency: NA-64
- In office 15 October 1993 – 5 November 1996
- Constituency: NA-64
- In office 3 November 1990 – 18 July 1993
- Constituency: NA-64
- In office 30 November 1988 – 6 August 1990
- Constituency: NA-64

Personal details
- Born: 1919 Punjab, Pakistan
- Died: 3 June 2016 (aged 96–97) Islamabad, Pakistan
- Party: Islami Jamhoori Ittehad
- Other political affiliations: Pakistan Muslim League (N)
- Education: Government Post Graduate College
- Military career
- Burial place: Jand, Chakwal
- Alma mater: Canadian Army Command and Staff College
- Allegiance: Pakistan; United Kingdom
- Branch: Pakistan Army; British India
- Service years: 1939–1976
- Rank: Lieutenant general Commissioned officer
- Units: 11th Infantry Division; Punjab Regiment
- Commands: Special Services Group; Military Operations
- Conflicts: World War II; Indo-Pakistani War of 1965; Indo-Pakistani War of 1971

Abdul Majeed Malik (1919 – 3 June 2016) was a lieutenant general in the Pakistan Army, World War II veteran, diplomat and later politician who served as minister of Kashmir Affairs & Northern Areas and minister of States & Frontier Regions from 11 July 1997 to 12 September 99. Prior to entering in the political race, he served as a director for military operations at general headquarters. Before the partition, he was a commissioned officer in the British Indian Army. He also drafted 1958 martial law, the first military coup of Pakistan.

He was born in 1919 in Jand, Chakwal, British India (in modern-day Punjab, Pakistan). He received his secondary education from a school at Hasola in 1935, and later went to Government High School Chakwal (in modern-day Government Post Graduate College).

== Career ==
=== Military ===
Before entering in politics and diplomatic career, he worked in the British Indian Army in 1939 as a sepoy. He initially served at a clerical job at the Punjab Regiment.

In 1943, he was selected as a commissioned officer in the British Indian Army. He was one of the veterans who observed the partition of India. Before the partition, he was also assigned the security duty of Mahatma Gandhi following the Direct Action Day peace talks between Gandhi and Huseyn Shaheed Suhrawardy.

After the India subcontinent was divided into two sovereign states such as India and Pakistan, he entered in the Pakistan Army and served at various posts, including as an instructor at the Pakistan Military Academy in 1962. After he qualified entrance examination from the Command and Staff College, he was sent to Canadian Army Command and Staff College where he received his military training. Upon his return, he was posted at Murree and Peshawar. When the country came under 1958 military coup, president Iskander Mirza was forced to submit his resignation from the presidency. Mirza's resignation letter was written by Malik. He was later appointed as commander of Special Services Group during the Indo-Pakistani War of 1965. He later commanded 11th Infantry Division. During the Indo-Pakistani War of 1971, he served as director for Military Operations at general headquarters in 1969.

When he was promoted to the rank of lieutenant general, he commanded XI Corps. When Tikka Khan retired from the service, Zulfikar Ali Bhutto had to appoint Malik as the Chief of the Army Staff. However, Lt General Zia-ul-Haq, who, after Lt General Majeed Malik, was at the seventh step in the race to become CASO, had earned Bhutto's favour. This resulted in Zia's appointment as CASO and being superseded, Lt General Malik resigned from the military service.

=== Politics ===
He started his political career in 1988 after electing to the National Assembly of Pakistan. He represented Chakwal constituency four times in 1988, 1990, 1993 and 1997. He won the first two terms on the ticket of Islami Jamhoori Ittehad, and the third and the fourth term on the ticket of Pakistan Muslim League (N).

During his political career, he served as minister of petroleum and minister of States & Frontier Regions in the government of Ghulam Mustafa Jatoi from 11 August 1990 to 6 November 1990. After Nawaz Sharif was elected prime minister, Malik was selected as minister of Kashmir Affairs & Northern Areas from 11 July 1997 to 12 September 1999.

After the 1999 coup d'état, he left politics and supported his son-in-law, Tahir Iqbal in the politics from his constituency.

=== Diplomatic career ===
After he retired from the politics, he was appointed ambassador of Pakistan to Morocco and later ambassador to France. During his diplomatic career in Morocco, he wrote several letters to Muhammad Zia-ul-Haq suggesting on foreign affairs. He also sent a letter to general Zia advising to withdraw execution of Zulfikar Ali Bhutto. In the latter years, he established Majeed Malik Education and Health Foundations. In 2008, he re-established his associations with Pakistan Muslim League (N) and supported Ayaz Amir in the politics than contesting general election for himself.

== Books ==
He wrote autobiography titled Hum Bhi Wahan Mojood Thay (we were there too). The book was published in 2015 by Sang-e-Meel Publications. The book contains detailed account of his life, Kargil War and how Pakistan conducted underground nuclear tests. He wrote in his book that Pervez Musharraf conducted military operations confidentially and didn't reveal the truth to Ashfaq Parvez Kayani. Kayani knew very little about the 1999 Kargil war. The book future claims that when Musharraf spoke to Chinese military general to discuss 1999 conflict, his phone call was allegedly tapped by the Indian intelligence agencies. The book also criticises Nawaz Sharif for appointing Ziauddin Butt as chief of army staff and unsuccessful attempts of dismissing Musharraf in 1999. Malik was one of the close associates of Nawaz Sharif, however after 1999 military takeover, he changed his mind and established his political association with Musharraf.

== Controversies ==
In 2005, Malik had to contest district nazim election, however, his candidacy on the grounds of his alleged fake matriculation certificate was challenged in the Supreme Court of Pakistan by Chaudhry Aurangzeb Khan, controller of examination (certificate) of the University of the Punjab and Mirza Rafiuzzaman, Rawalpindi district returning officer. He later filed a petition to the Supreme Court contesting the paper rejection by returning officer. Malik pleaded in his petition that returning officer had never produced reliable material to prove his alleged bogus certificate. Returning officer alleged that Malik had never passed his matriculation in 1939.

In December 2005, the supreme court lifted the ban on his nomination paper after the University of the Punjab declared his certificate valid.

== Death ==
Malik was suffering from coronary artery disease. He was admitted to the Combined Military Hospital for medical treatment. He died in Islamabad on 3 June 2016 in late Friday at the hospital. His body was shifted to his hometown in Chakwal, Punjab and was buried on Saturday in a cemetery at his village, Jand, Chakwal.
