= Mohra Topian =

- Village
- Country: Pakistan
- Province: Punjab (Pakistan)
- District: Rawalpindi
- Time zone: UTC+5 (PST)

Mohra Topian is a village in Gujar Khan Tehsil, a sub-division of Rawalpindi District, Pakistan. The village is connected to the cities of Gujar Khan (25 km) and Daultala (15 km) by a well-built road. It is connected to the Chakwal-Jhelum road by a link road of 4 km located at Pir Phalahi.

Nearby villages include Thakra, Kalas, Chak Qada,Kanyal Bajrana, Kolian, Dhoke Kashmirian, Bardiana, Faryal and Miana Mohra.
