= Barki =

Barki or Barqi may refer to

== People ==
- Ahmad Ali Barqi Azmi (born 1954), Indian Urdu poet
- Ahmed Barki (born 1980), Moroccan boxer
- Henri Barki, Turkish-Canadian social scientist
- Justin Barki (born 2000), Indonesian tennis player
- Khairi Barki (born 1995), Algerian footballer

== Places ==
- Barqi, Razavi Khorasan, Iran
- Cheshmeh Barqi, Iran
- Qasemabad-e Cheshmeh Barqi, Iran
- Barki, Pakistan also Burki, a village in Lahore District, Punjab, Pakistan; site of the Battle of Burki during the Indo-Pakistani war of 1965
- Burki Budhal or Barki Badhal, a village in Gujar Khan Tehsil, Rawalpindi District, Pakistan
- Barki, Poland

== Other ==
- Barkchi, a football club in Tajikistan
- Barqi Tojik, a national power company of Tajikistan

== See also ==
- Barkis (disambiguation)
- Burki (disambiguation)
