= Marshmallow (disambiguation) =

A marshmallow is a confection typically made from sugar, water and gelatin.

Marshmallow may also refer to:

== Arts, entertainment, and media ==
=== Fictional entities ===
- Marshmallow (book), a 1942 picture book about a pet rabbit of the same name, by Clare Turlay Newberry
- Marshmallow, a main character from the online series Annoying Orange
- Marshmallow, a fictional character from the 2013 Disney animated film Frozen
- Marshmallow, a fictional character from the 2016 incremental dating sim Crush Crush

=== Music ===
==== Groups and labels ====
- Marshmallow (band), a band from London, England
- Marshmallow Records & Marshmallow Exports, a Japanese independent jazz record label founded in 1978
- Marshmello, an American DJ

==== Works ====
- Marshmallows (album) (1996), an album by The For Carnation
- "Marshmallow", a song by IU from the album IU...IM

Film

- Marshmallow (film) (2025), a science fiction horror film directed by Daniel DelPurgatorio

== Foods ==
- Marshmallow creme or "fluff", a spreadable marshmallow-like substance

== Other uses ==
- Android Marshmallow, version 6.0 of Google's operating system for mobile devices
- Althaea officinalis, a plant known as the "marshmallow", from which the confection was originally made
- Basketball Arena (London), venue of the 2012 Summer Olympics, colloquially known as the Marshmallow
- Marshmallows, term for fans of the Veronica Mars series
