= Punjdehra =

Punjdhera
- Village and union council
- Country: Pakistan
- Region: Punjab Province
- District: Chakwal District
- Time zone: UTC+5 (PST)

Punjdhera (Urdu: پنج ڈیہرا) is a village and union council of Chakwal is a district of Punjab, Pakistan.
