= NA-58 Chakwal =

Constituency of the National Assembly of Pakistan

- Constituency for the National Assembly of Pakistan
- Region: Chakwal Tehsil (partly) including Chakwal city, Kallar Kahar Tehsil (partly) and Choa Saidan Shah Tehsil of Chakwal District
- Electorate: 551,011

Current constituency
- Party: Pakistan Muslim League (N)
- Member: Tahir Iqbal
- Created from: NA-60 Chakwal-I

NA-58 Chakwal (این اے-58، چکوال) is a constituency for the National Assembly of Pakistan.

== Members of Parliament ==
=== 1988–2002: NA-43 Chakwal-I ===
| Election | Member | Party |
|---|---|---|
| 1988 | Abdul Majeed Malik | IJI |
| 1990 | Abdul Majeed Malik | IJI |
| 1993 | Abdul Majeed Malik | PML-N |
| 1997 | Abdul Majeed Malik | PML-N |

=== 2002–2018: NA-60 Chakwal-I ===
| Election | Member | Party |
|---|---|---|
| 2002 | Tahir Iqbal | PML-Q |
| 2008 | Ayaz Amir | PML-N |
| 2013 | Tahir Iqbal | PML-N |

=== 2018–2023: NA-64 Chakwal-I ===
| Election | Member | Party |
|---|---|---|
| 2018 | Zulfiqar Ali Khan Dullah | PTI |

=== 2024–present ===
| Election | Member | Party |
|---|---|---|
| 2024 | Tahir Iqbal | PML-N |

== Election 2002 ==
General elections were held on 10 October 2002. Major Tahir Iqbal of PML-Q won by 72,331 votes.

General election 2008: NA-60 Chakwal-I
| Party | Candidate | Votes | % | ±% |
|---|---|---|---|---|
| PML(Q) | Tahir Iqbal | 72,331 | 36.10 | |
| PML(N) | Ayaz Amir | 70,080 | 34.98 | |
| PPP | Khurram Nawab | 41,006 | 20.47 | |
| MMA | Sahibzada Nasir Jamil Hashmi | 14,084 | 7.03 | |
| Others | Others (two candidates) | 2,854 | 1.42 | |
| Turnout | | 204,550 | 52.87 | |
| Total valid votes | | 200,355 | 97.95 | |
| Rejected ballots | | 4,195 | 2.05 | |
| Majority | | 2,251 | 1.12 | |
| Registered electors | | 386,932 | | |

== Election 2008 ==
The result of general election 2008 in this constituency is given below.

=== Result ===
Ayaz Amir succeeded in the election 2008 and became the member of National Assembly.

General election 2008: NA-60 Chakwal-I
| Party | Candidate | Votes | % | ±% |
|---|---|---|---|---|
| PML(N) | Ayaz Amir | 125,437 | 51.78 | |
| PML(Q) | Sardar Muhammad Nawab Khan | 91,255 | 37.67 | |
| PPP | Fozia Behram | 24,546 | 10.13 | |
| Independent | Shaheen Baig | 1,018 | 0.42 | |
| Turnout | | 247,146 | 57.03 | |
| Total valid votes | | 242,256 | 98.02 | |
| Rejected ballots | | 4,890 | 1.98 | |
| Majority | | 34,182 | 14.11 | |
| Registered electors | | 433,391 | | |
| PML(N) gain from PML(Q) | | | | |

== Election 2013 ==
General elections were held on 11 May 2013. Major Tahir Iqbal of PML-N won by 130,821 votes and became the member of National Assembly.

General election 2013: NA-60 Chakwal-I
| Party | Candidate | Votes | % | ±% |
|---|---|---|---|---|
| PML(N) | Tahir Iqbal | 130,821 | 44.35 | |
| Independent | Sardar Ghulam Abbas | 100,827 | 34.18 | |
| PTI | Raja Yassir Humayun Sarfraz | 48,076 | 16.30 | |
| PPP | Raja Muhammad Sana UI Haq | 11,101 | 3.76 | |
| Others | Others (six candidates) | 4,170 | 1.41 | |
| Turnout | | 304,554 | 62.66 | |
| Total valid votes | | 294,995 | 96.86 | |
| Rejected ballots | | 9,559 | 3.14 | |
| Majority | | 29,994 | 42.70 | 10.17 |
| Registered electors | | 486,070 | | |
| PML(N) hold | | | | |

== Election 2018 ==
General elections were held on 25 July 2018.

General election 2018: NA-64 Chakwal-I
| Party | Candidate | Votes | % | ±% |
|---|---|---|---|---|
| PTI | Zulfiqar Ali Khan Dullah | 155,214 | 48.44 | |
| PML(N) | Tahir Iqbal | 130,051 | 40.59 | |
| Others | Others (eight candidates) | 26,090 | 8.14 | |
| Turnout | | 320,394 | 58.15 | |
| Rejected ballots | | 9,039 | 2.83 | |
| Majority | | 25,163 | 7.85 | |
| Registered electors | | 551,011 | | |
| PTI gain from PML(N) | | | | |

== Election 2024 ==
General elections were held on 8 February 2024. Tahir Iqbal won the election with 163,873 votes.

General election 2024: NA-58 Chakwal
| Party | Candidate | Votes | % | ±% |
|---|---|---|---|---|
| PML(N) | Tahir Iqbal | 163,873 | 45.32 | ▲4.73 |
| PTI | Ayaz Amir (Note: Filed nomination papers as PTI candidate but ECP allowed him to run as an Independent) | 152,819 | 42.26 | ▼6.18 |
| TLP | Raja Sohail Akhtar Satti | 23,554 | 6.51 | ▲2.09 |
| IPP | Sardar Zulfiqar Ali Khan Dullah | 13,108 | 3.62 | ▲0.97 |
| Others | Others (fifteen candidates) | 8,248 | 2.28 | |
| Turnout | | 367,686 | 61.90 | ▲3.75 |
| Total valid votes | | 361,602 | 98.35 | |
| Rejected ballots | | 6,084 | 1.65 | |
| Majority | | 11,054 | 3.06 | |
| Registered electors | | 594,009 | | |
| PML(N) gain from PTI | | | | |

== See also ==
- NA-57 Rawalpindi-VI
- NA-59 Chakwal-cum-Talagang
