= Dhoke Budhal =

Coordinates: 33°08′00″N 73°09′48.60″E

Dhoke Budhal ڈھوک بدہال
- Interactive map of Dhoke Budhal
- Country: Pakistan
- Region: Punjab
- District: Rawalpindi District
- Tehsil: Gujar Khan Tehsil
- Union Council: Narali

Population
  - Total: 1,500
- Time zone: UTC+5 (PST)
  - Summer (DST): UTC+6 (PDT)
- Postal Code: 47761
- Area code: 0513

Dhoke Budhal (Urdu:ڈھوک بدہال) (U.C Narali) is a village in Rawalpindi District, of Punjab, Pakistan.

== Etymology ==
In the Pothohari dialect of Punjabi, "Dhoke" means a small chunk of people or houses, while Budhal is the title given to a specified group of "Awan" tribe. As most of the inhabitants (about 98%) of this village are of the Awan "Budhal" descent, the name depict the "abode of Budhals".

== Geography ==
The village is located at 33° 08' 00.60" N and 73° 09' 48.60" E in the northern part of Union Council Narali. Dhoke Manna is bordering North East side of village, Miana Mohra touches the boundary of Dhoke Budhal to South-East, Narali is located in south, while north west side is covered by PPL oil fields and Village Mastala.

== History ==
It is believed that Qadi Khan قادى خان (Awan tribal leader), moved to Narali from Dora Budhal ڈوره بدھال during the 18th century. When, how and why Budhals moved to current location of Dhoke Budhal is not known. The presence of only one tribe (i.e. Awan) and all Sunni Muslims indicates that either this community never accepted outsiders or other communities not tried to move in this village.
