= Sardar Zulfiqar Ali Khan Dullah =

Pakistani politician

Member of the National Assembly of Pakistan
- In office 13 August 2018 – 25 January 2023
- Constituency: NA-64 (Chakwal-I)

Member of the Provincial Assembly of the Punjab
- In office 29 May 2013 – 31 May 2018

Personal details
- Born: 19 May 1954 (age 72) Chakwal, Punjab, Pakistan
- Party: PPP (2024-present)
- Other political affiliations: IPP (2023-2024); PTI (2018-2023); PMLN (2013-2018)

Sardar Zulfiqar Ali Khan Dullah سردار ذوالفقار علی خان دلہ is a Pakistani politician who had been a member of the National Assembly of Pakistan from August 2018 till January 2023. Previously he was a Member of the Provincial Assembly of the Punjab, from May 2013 to May 2018.

== Early life and education ==
He was born on 19 May 1954 in Chakwal.

He graduated in law from the University of Karachi in 1997 and has degrees of Bachelor of Arts and Bachelor of Laws.

== Political career ==
He was elected to the Provincial Assembly of the Punjab as a candidate of Pakistan Muslim League (N) (PML-N) from Constituency PP-22 (Chakwal-III) in the 2013 Pakistani general election.

In June 2018, he was nominated by the PML-N as its candidate from Constituency PP-23 (Chakwal-III) for the 2018 general election. However he quit PML-N and joined Pakistan Tehreek-e-Insaaf (PTI).

He was elected to the National Assembly of Pakistan as a candidate of PTI from Constituency NA-64 (Chakwal-I) in the 2018 general election. He received 155,214 votes and defeated Tahir Iqbal.

In 2023, he quit PTI to join IPP, but a few weeks later, he quit IPP to join PPP. He contested election for NA-58 Chakwal on PPP ticket in 2024 General Elections. He received 13,108 votes, finishing on fourth position.

== Controversy ==
In September 2018, a deputy commissioner from Chakwal wrote a letter to the Election Commission of Pakistan and the Supreme Court of Pakistan in which he accused Dullah of illegally interfering in transfers and postings of 17 members of the revenue field staff. The deputy commissioner also accused Dullah of threatening him "with dire consequences in case of non-compliance".

== More Reading ==
- List of members of the 15th National Assembly of Pakistan
