= Tarati, Pakistan =

Tarati
- Village
- Interactive map of Tarati
- Coordinates: 33°07′00″N 73°10′48.60″E
- Country: Pakistan
- Tehsil: Gujar Khan
- District: Rawalpindi
- Union council: Adhi

Government
  - Number Dar: Shiraz Ahmed

Population (2017)
  - Total: 1,372

Ethnicity
  - Ethnic groups: Bhati Rajput, Gujjar, Awan

Faith
  - Religion: Islam
- Time zone: PST +05:00 ahead of GMT
- Area code: 0513
- Post office: Dhoong

Tarati (Urdu: تراٹی, pronounced [təɾaːʈiː]), is a village in Adhi Union Council, Gujar Khan Tehsil, Rawalpindi District, Punjab, Pakistan, in the centre of the Pothohar cultural region. The area has considerable natural resources in the form of petroleum and natural gas. It is approximately 45 kilometres southeast of Islamabad, the capital of Pakistan.

== Demographics ==
The population of the village, according to 2017 census was 1,372.

== Economics ==
Tarati is a mainly agricultural village, with wheat and groundnuts as the major crops.

== Languages ==
The local language is Pothowari.

== Transport ==
Tarati is situated off the Daultala – Mulhal Mughlan Road. Gujar Khan is about 18 kilometers, Rawalpindi - Islamabad is about 45 kilometers and Chakwal is about 26 kilometers from Tarati.
