= Dhoong =

Dhoong ڈھونگ
- Village
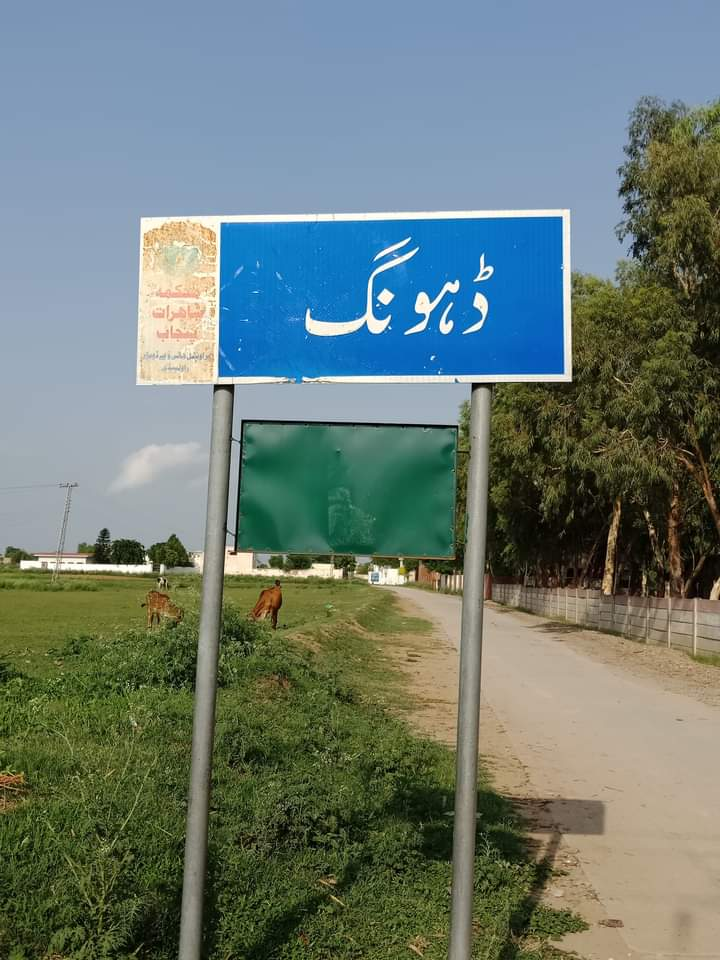
- Dhoong

- Location in Pakistan
- Coordinates: 33°07′0″N 73°10′48.60″E
- Country: Pakistan
- Province: Punjab
- District: Rawalpindi
- Tehsil: Gujar Khan
- Union council: Narali

Population
  - Total: 4,560
- Time zone: UTC+5 (PST)
- Postal Code: 47770
- Area code: 051-3

Dhoong (Urdu: ڈھونگ, Urdu pronunciation: [ɖʱuːŋɡ], Punjabi pronunciation: [ɖùːŋɡ]), is a village in Gujar Khan Tehsil, Rawalpindi District in Punjab province of Pakistan. Dhoong is a historic village in and is noted for its reserves of oil and natural gas.

== Educational institutions ==
- Global Vision Montessori & School Dhoong Campus
- Govt. Boys High School Dhoong
- Govt. Girls High School Dhoong
- Al-Hijra islamic school Dhoong
- Madrissa Touseef-Ul-Quran Dhoong

== Health ==
- Basic Health Unit Dhoong

== Post office ==
- Post Office Dhoong 47770, GPO Gujar Khan

== Banks ==
- Habib Bank Ltd., Dhoong Branch

== Telecommunication ==
The PTCL provides the main network of landline telephones. Many ISPs and all major mobile phone and wireless companies operating in Pakistan provide service in Dhoong.

== Surrounding villages ==
- Tarati, Ahdi (Union Council), Narali, Daultala, Jatli (Police Station), Dhoke Adra, Dhoke Budhal, Dhoke Cheemian, Dhoke Kanyal Bajrana, Dhoke Landian, Faryal, Fazolian, Kayal, Thakra Mohra, Mastala, (Dohda, Langah, Domali, Jand- District Chakwal) Dhoke Baba Noor (Dhoke Gujran).

== Transport ==
- Dhoong is situated on the Daultala – Mulhal Mughlan Road. Gujar Khan is about 18 kilometers away, Rawalpindi - Islamabad is about 45 kilometers, and Chakwal is about 26 kilometers from Dhoong. There are many ways to get around in Dhoong, including public transport, buses, various kinds of private hire vehicle including vans, cars, taxis, and auto-rickshaws, motorcycles, and tractors.
