= Barkis =

Barkis may refer to:

- Ormur people
- Challah, bread
- Barkis, (or Bergis) a Swedish bread
- a character in David Copperfield (novel)
- Andrew Barkis, American politician
- Marvin Barkis (born 1943), American politician
- Barkis, a 1938 picture book by Clare Turlay Newberry
- Barkis & Co., design & marketing agency www.barkis.com

== See also ==
- Barki (disambiguation)
