= Bhagwal =

Bhagwal may refer to:

- Bhagwal, Gujrat, a village in Gujrat District, Punjab, Pakistan
- Bhagwal, Chakwal, a village in Chakwal District, Punjab, Pakistan
