= Burki (disambiguation) =

Burki is a Pashtun tribe.

Burki may also refer to:

- Burki boots
- Burki (surname)
- Burki or Barki, Pakistan, village in Lahore District, Punjab, Pakistan
- Burki, Belarus, agrotown in Belarus
- Burki, Poland, former settlement in Poland, now part of Sławków

== See also ==
- Barki (disambiguation)
- Burki Budhal, a village in Gujar Khan Tehsik, Rawalpindi District, Pakistan
