= Thakra =

Thakra Mohra
- Location in Pakistan
- Coordinates: 33°06′14″N 73°10′35″E
- Country: Pakistan
- Province: Punjab
- Elevation: 173 m (568 ft)
- Time zone: UTC+5 (PST)

Thakra is a village in the Gujar Khan Tehsil of Rawalpindi District in the Punjab province of Pakistan. It links Rawalpindi, Chakwal and Jhelum. Thakra is located at an altitude of 173 metres (568 ft).

== Location ==
Nearest places within 200 km of Mohra Thakra

- Narali (1.7 km)
- Topian (1.7 km)
- Dhok Chunnuh (1.9 km)
- Dhok Buda (1.9 km)
- Dhok Farial (1.9 km)
- Dhok Fazulian (2.3 km)
- Chak Kada (2.4 km)
- Kalas (1.4 km)
- Bardiana (2.5 km)
- Haphi (2.5 km)
- Dhok Landan (2.9 km)
- Dhok Baba Murad Bakhsh (2.9 km)
- Dhok Shamas (3.1 km)
- Kolian (3.1 km)
- Dhok Badhalan (3.3 km)
- Bijrana (3.3 km)
- Dhok Adra (3.4 km)
- Miana Mohra (3.4 km)
- Kabil (3.5 km)
- Chak Rajgan (4.5 km)

== Main castes ==
Thakra Mohra castes include Syeds, Thakars, Awans, Qureshis,Rajputs, Choudries, Bhattis, Wazirs, Lohars, Turkhans, Mochis, Kashmiris, Julahay, Kumhar, Musallis and Maashkis.

== Religion ==
Thakra is a village where the community is predominantly Sunni, but it also embraces a small Shia population. The village is home to five Sunni mosques and one Shia mosque, along with a Shia Imambargah. In addition to these places of worship, there are two tombs (dargahs) that hold significance for the villagers.

== Politics ==
In politics, there are many figures who have left a lasting impact, some of whom have died, while others continue to serve. Among them, many come from the Thakar and Awan communities. Today, the local councilor from this area represents the Pakistan Muslim League (Nawaz) party, highlighting the ongoing influence of these communities in the political landscape of Pakistan.

== Land and crops ==
Thakra Mohra has fertile lands where crops including wheat, groundnut, maize, barley, masoor and gram are grown. Half of its lands are irrigated by the Narali Dam. Most of the cultivable lands are owned by the Thakars,Awans. Most of the water-wells have dried up, threatening the village's future.

== Education ==
Thakra provides educational opportunities with a middle school for girls and a primary school for boys, though the village does not have a high school. The literacy rate is gradually improving, reflecting the community's commitment to education. Many residents are making their mark in various professions, showcasing their skills and talents. Additionally, a few young boys are taking the initiative to study abroad, eager to broaden their horizons and gain new experiences.

== Development ==
Gas, electricity and digital telephone with many subscribers of high-speed internet.
