= Government Graduate College Chakwal =

Pakistani college

Government Graduate College
- گورنمنٹ گریجویٹ کالج چکوال
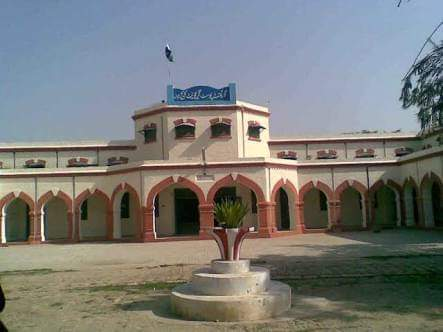
- Type: Public
- Established: 1949
- Affiliations: University of Gujrat & Board of Intermediate and Secondary Education, Rawalpindi
- Principal: Prof Ghulam Muhammad Jhaggar
- Students: 8,000+
- Location: Chakwal, Punjab, Pakistan; 32°56′5″N 72°51′35″E
- Campus: Urban
- Colours: Green and White
- Nickname: GC Chakwal

Government Graduate College Chakwal (Urdu: گورنمنٹ گریجویٹ کالج چکوال) is a tertiary college located in Chakwal District in Punjab province of Pakistan. It is the largest educational institute of Chakwal. Government of Punjab introduced BS (4 year) in 2010, for both male and female students. This college was affiliated with University of Gujrat for both BS and MA/MSC degree programs until its merger with University of Chakwal. Before BS (4 years) degree program, this college had BA and MA/MSC degree programs that were affiliated with University of Punjab. This college offered BS degree in 8 subjects (Economics, English, Chemistry, Botany, Physics, Mathematics, Islamic Studies, International Relation and IT). Classes of 1st and 2nd year are also held here.

There are two main campuses, one for BS and the other for inter students. Master Classes in English, Physics and Mathematics are engaged at BS campus as well. The college has a separate IT Department. A mosque is situated in the college. A boys' hostel is there with a badminton court. The college has cricket, hockey and football grounds along with tennis and basketball courts as well. There are separate canteens for boys and girls. A library is situated in college. A new auditorium is established here (called SEITHI Hall). Another building for women is under construction within the college. In December 2019, Punjab Assembly pass the bill to establish University of Chakwal by combining this college and U.E.T Chakwal Campus.

== History ==
Historically, the beginning of the Government Graduate College Chakwal almost corresponds with the emergence of Pakistan. The locals always aspired to have an institution of higher learning. Eventually, it fell to Raja Sarfaraz Khan, the member of the Punjab Assembly, who delivered precious land in addition to a handsome amount and became the Sir Syed of the Chakwal.

The college was inaugurated in 1949 in the present edifice. Khan Fazal Muhammad was its first principal. The faculty at that time comprised 14 professors teaching almost 300 students. Now there are many teachers and more than 2,500 students. In 1989, students of the college launched a movement for upgradation of the college to the Graduate Level and consequently MA/Msc in Physics, English and Mathematics were introduced in the same year.

In 2010, BS (Hons) 4-year programme in collaboration with University of Gujrat was started.

== Faculties and departments ==
Government Graduate College Chakwal consists of eight faculties and the following main departments;

- Department of Chemistry
- Department of Islamic Studies
- Department of Botany and Biology
- Department of Economics
- Department of Information Technology
- Department of Mathematics
- Department of Physics
- Department of English

Minor departments include:

- Department of Geography
- Department of Political Science and International Relations
- Department of Psychology
- Department of Urdu
- Department of Sociology
- Department of History
- Department of Statistics
- Department of Pakistan Studies
