= Mastala =

- Village
- Country: Pakistan
- Province: Punjab (Pakistan)
- District: Rawalpindi
- Time zone: UTC+5 (PST)

Mastala (Urdu:مستاله) is a village in Gujar Khan Tehsil, Rawalpindi District in the Punjab of Pakistan. Mastala is part of Narali Union Council.

== Demographics ==
The founder of the main clan was Mast Khan, after whom the village is named. Local tradition narrates his arrival in the territory some time during the 16th century A.D. Those were early days Mughal Dynastic rule of the Sub Continent. He had the vision and foresight of locating his settlement on the best vantage point in the area available. Majority of Mastala's population consists of his descendants. They belong to the sub-caste Minhas of Rajputs Pakhral of Rajputs, and almost 95% of the village's population are of the same clan. The rest of the population consists of minor castes, historically known to benefit from the services rendered to the only major caste. The dominant religion of the village is Sunni Islam.

== Education ==
Mastala has a reasonable literacy rate. Majority of population have education till matriculation and intermediate level . Among new generation, several students are pursuing their studies in different cities of Pakistan such as Rawalpindi, Islamabad, Lahore and Karachi, etc. Importantly, some of students from Mastala are studying abroad. Remarkably, one of the female who not only got scholarship to pursue her MS and PhD studies in world renowned universities, but she also served at a prestigious university like NUST for few years and now working in a foreign country as a foreign research expert. Similarly, another female who belongs to this village is serving in army as medical doctor. In addition to this remarkable example, several other females have completed their master's degrees from different universities in Pakistan in diverse field of studies like business administration, statistics, history, biology, education and English., etc., Male population is not far behind females. There are some of the engineers, who have completed their degrees in different field and are now serving their nation. Among both females and males population, there are few people who have reached to 18 and 19 grades. Unfortunately, there is only primary schools for both females and males students from government. Thus most of the students have to study in nearby town in private schools and some in government schools.

== Economy ==
Farming and rearing of livestock has traditionally been the major occupation of the people. However, since the arrival of PPL at the local Adhi Oil and Gas field, majority of work force is currently employed at PPL and associated LPG filling plants including WAK Gas, SUN Gas, CAP Gas and PARCO PEARL GAS. A good percentage is employed in Pakistan Army and the Pakistan water and Power Development authority. Teaching is a major occupation of both male and female members. Presence of PPL along with allied plants has significantly contributed towards financial well being of the people.

=== Oil and gas ===
Mastala is host to the Adhi oil and gas field. It is a joint venture (JV) between PPL as operator, Oil and Gas Development Company Limited (OGDCL) and Pakistan Oilfields Limited (POL), with working interest of 39, 50 and 11 percent, respectively. Field is located about 70 km south of Islamabad in the Pothwar region.

Exploration at the Adhi field began in 1956 and continued for a decade, during which four wells were drilled. Due to various complications, the four wells were eventually abandoned.

In 1976, a seismic survey was carried out that led to the drilling of Adhi 5, a discovery well, in 1978, proving the presence of hydrocarbons.

Crude oil production from the field commenced in the early 1980s from Sakesar reservoir. Other two reservoirs discovered were Tobra & Khewra bearing gas/ condensate. Adhi was declared a commercial discovery in June 1984. However, production from Sakesar was suspended in 1986 due to excessive water in produced crude. Subsequently, field was developed on Tobra/ Khewra reservoir and an LPG/ NGL plant was installed and commissioned in January 1991.

Following the 3D seismic survey in 1998, indicating additional oil and gas potential, a re-evaluation of reserves was undertaken which predicted increased recoverable reserves in Khewra and Tobra reservoirs. As a result, five additional wells were drilled.

The existing LPG/ NGL recovery facilities were enhanced by installing another plant of a similar capacity which was commissioned in September 2006, doubling production from the field.

A Compositional Reservoir Study was conducted in 2011, based on which further development is being carried out.

To date, a total of 22 wells have been drilled in Adhi, including recently drilled well Adhi-22, of which 13 wells are currently on production from Tobra-Khewra reservoir and two from the Sakesar formation. An early production facility was also installed between 2002 and 2003 to obtain production from Sakesar wells.

Adhi's major clients are SNGPL for gas, Attock Refinery Limited for NGL / crude oil and various LPG marketing companies.

- Discovery: 1978
- Producing Wells: 15
- Recoverable Reserves:
  - 13.6 billion m^{3} (482 billion ft^{3}) gas
  - 950,000 m^{3} (6 million bbl) oil
  - 7.3 million m^{3} (46 million bbl) NGL
  - 1,457 Thousand tonnes LPG
- Daily Average Production:
  - 1,200 thousand m^{3} (41 million ft^{3}) at standard conditions
  - 400 m^{3} (2,515 bbl)
  - 585 m^{3} (3,684 bbl)
  - 154 tonnes LPG

=== Agriculture ===
Mastala's agriculture is mostly dependent on rainfall for irrigation. For storing water, 3 small pounds and one big pound have been constructed by the people of Mastala using their own resources.

Major crops grown in the village include wheat, maize, peanut, gram, millet and mustard.

== Sports ==
Raja Mohammad Sharif is one of the most notable sportsman of the Mastala, he has represented Pakistan as a boxer in national and international sports events and won several titles for Pakistan.

Cricket, football and volleyball are commonly played games of the place.

== Public transport ==
Minibus and suzuki pickups are use as public transport and Auto Rickshaw are also used by the people.
