= Bishan Daur =

- Location within Pakistan
- Coordinates: 33.12°N 73.25°E
- Country: Pakistan
- Province: Punjab
- District: Jhelum
- Time zone: UTC+5 (PST)

Bishan Daur is a village of Jhelum District in the Punjab province of Pakistan. It is located at 33°12'0″N 73°25'0E at an altitude of 430 metres (1414 feet). The name was officially changed to Dewan e Hazoori during the first term of prime minister Nawaz Sharif upon the request and invitation of Custodian of the shrine of Hazrat Syed Abdullah Shah DewaneHazoori Pir Dildar Ali Shah.

The main tribe in the village is Awan Budhal.
