= Budhal (tribe) =

The Budhal are a clan of the Golra division of the Awan tribe,

== History ==
As per the manuscript 'Tareekh e Budhal' written in 1720s, as well as, the 1860 and 1880s British India land settlement records, Budhals are a branch of the Awan tribe descended from Qutb Shah's grandson, called Ahmed Ali, who had the agnomen of 'Badruddin urf Buddo/Budh Shah'. Due to the confusion of similar sounding names, this clan should not be confused with Badhal, Banderhal, Bodlah / Bodla clans, who are categorized as either Rajput or Jat clans, and reside near Kashmir region.

It was believed by the later British-Raj sociologists that the clan had migrated across the Jhelum River from Jammu and Kashmir, however this is conjecture, to connect the clan with a region with a similar sounding name in Jammu and Kashmir, which has derived its name from a local type of hardwood.

Rather, it can be said that, the Budhal were erstwhile allies of the Gakhar tribe, migrating from Murat (Fateh Jang district) to Takht Pari (Rawat, Rawalpindi district), with the prominent members, Ali Murad Khan and Shaikh Ahmed Chaikar, being in senior military and religious leadership roles for Gakhar Sultans; Hathi Khan, Sarang Khan and Adam Khan in the early 16th century.

Tribal sources state that, in the 16th century, the sons of Ali Murad Khan & Shaikh Ahmed Chaikar (laqab Chakar Khan), founded or settled at following villages:

- Ali Murad:
  - Mohammad Khan - was gifted a jagir (fiefdom) of Dora Budhal by Sultan Sarang Khan Gakhar,
  - Ikhtiyar Khan settled at Narali,
  - Qaddar Khan & Abbas Khan settled at Bishandaur, and
  - Ghazi Khan - was gifted a jagir (fiefdom) of Burki Budhal by Sultan Sarang Khan Gakhar.
- Shaikh Ahmed Chaikar - was gifted a jagir (fiefdom) of Chakrali Budhal by Sultan Hathi Khan Gakhar:
  - Shaikh Naseeb Khan (Chuhr Shah Ghazi)- was gifted a jagir (fiefdom) of Surghdan by Sultan Hathi Khan Gakhar.

In the 18th century, the Sikh Khatri community flourished and expanded their business from Dora Budhal to other nearby villages and towns of Gujar Khan due to the conducive environment provided by the Budhal noblemen.

In the 19th century, the Budhals of influence were:

- Sirbuland (Surroo) Khan of Burki Budhal,
- Buhawal Khan of Dora Budhal,
- Hussoo Khan of Kountra,
- Hadaytullah of Kountrila, and
- Sardar Khan, ilaqadar (estate holder) of Surgdhan

== Use of 'Raja' title ==
Like other tribes of non-Rajput origin, some of the Budhals were given the title of 'Raja' by the Sikh rulership and later by the British from the 19th century, although presently, this title has fallen out of favour. This was clearly to denote a certain social position in a Rajput dominated society in the Potohar region.

== Location ==
The Budhal clan occupy a block of villages, in Gujar Khan Tehsil,

- Tehsil Gujar Khan, District Rawalpindi - Dora Budhal, Burki Budhal (near Gujar Khan), Chakrali Budhal, Jarmot Khurd, Jarmot Kalan, Bardiana, Faraash and Garmala (near Kountrila),
- Tehsil Kallar Syedan, District Rawalpindi - Kallar Syedan, Sahot Budhal and Mangal
- Tehsil Sohawa, District Jhelum - Bishandaur, Surgdhan, Jandot Shah Safeer and Khabbal Awan.
- Jhammat, Tehsil Jand, District Attock

Their customs are similar to other tribes in the vicinity, speaking the Pothohari Punjabi and following Sunni and Shia branches of Islam.

== See also ==
- Tribes and clans of the Pothohar Plateau
