= Talib Chakwali =

Urdu writer (1900–1988)

- طالب چکوالی
- Born: Manohar Lal Kapur; 1900; Chakwal, Punjab, British India
- Died: 1988 (aged 87–88); Delhi, India
- Children: 7

Talib Chakwali (1900–1988) was a prominent Indian Urdu ghazal poet and especially Nazm writer from Chakwal, India. His real name was Manohar Lal Kapur but he decided to use Talib Chakwali as his takhallus (pen name).

== Biography ==
Chakwali is the takhallus (nom de plume) of Manohar Lal Kapur, born in Chakwal, Punjab, British India (now Pakistan), on 13 May 1900 into a Punjabi Hindu Khatri family. He was the only son of Bal Mukand Kapur, orphaned soon after birth and brought up by his grandfather, Ishwar Das, a wealthy zamindar. His family originally hailed from Balkh, the ancient city of Afghanistan, and had firstly migrated to Peshawar before moving to Chakwal. After completing his school at Chakwal High-School, he obtained his BA (Hons.) degree in 1921 from Government College University, Lahore, and his LLB degree in 1923 from the Punjab University Law College. He practiced law in Chakwal from 1923 to 1936, later moving to Rawalpindi where he established himself as a wholesale supplier of building materials. Post partition of British India in 1947 he migrated to Delhi where he died in 1988. He married Krishnawati, daughter of Rai Sahib Karam Chand Talwar, in 1921.

== Literary life ==
Chakwali commenced writing poems in English and Punjabi when he was studying in Lahore but subsequently shifted to Urdu. In 1932, he founded the Bazm e Adab. His poetry reveals the influence of Wordsworth, Shelley, Zauq, Ghalib and Iqbal. His first collection of poems titled Anwaar e Haqiqat, carrying an introduction by Choudhary Zakallah was published in 1929. His second collection Barg e Sabz with a foreword by Brij Mohan Dattareya Kaifi was published in 1965, and his third collection, Mor Pankh was published in 1987.
