= List of cities in Punjab, Pakistan by area =

Here is the list of cities in Punjab, Pakistan, by area. In this list only the area of each city is considered, not that of villages.

== Punjab hassan ==
No.	District	Headquartered city	City area km^{2} (sqmi)
01	Attock District	Attock City	20 (7.7)
02	Bahawalnagar District	Bahawalnagar City	13 (5.0)
03	Bahawalpur District	Bahawalpur City	134 (51.7)
04	Bhakkar District	Bhakkar City	15 (5.8)
05	Chakwal District	Chakwal City	10 (3.9)
06	Chiniot District	Chiniot City	12 (4.6)
07	Dera Ghazi Khan District	Dera Ghazi Khan	22 (8.5)
08	Faisalabad District	Faisalabad City	1,326 (512.0)
09	Gujranwala District	Gujranwala City	264 (101.9)
10	Gujrat District	Gujrat City	25 (9.7)
11	Hafizabad District	Hafizabad City	10 (3.9)
12	Jhang District	Jhang City	39 (15.1)
13	Jhelum District	Jhelum City	22 (8.5)
14	Kasur District	Kasur City	18 (6.9)
15	Khanewal District	Khanewal City	17 (6.6)
16	Khushab District	Jauharabad City	12 (4.6)
17	Lahore District	Lahore City	1,772 (684.2)
18	Layyah District	Layyah City	10 (3.9)
19	Lodhran District	Lodhran City	08 (3.1)
20	Mandi Bahauddin District	Mandi Bahauddin	09 (3.5)
21	Mianwali District	Mianwali City	20 (7.7)
22	Multan District	Multan City	1,090 (420.9)
23	Muzaffargarh District	Muzaffargarh City	15 (5.8)
24	Nankana Sahib District	Nankana Sahib City	06 (2.3)
25	Narowal District	Narowal City	07 (2.7)
26	Okara District	Okara City	21 (8.1)
27	Pakpattan District	Pakpattan City	14 (5.4)
28	Rahim Yar Khan District	Rahim Yar Khan City	22 (8.5)
29	Rajanpur District	Rajanpur City	06 (2.3)
30	Rawalpindi District	Rawalpindi City	255 (98.5)
31	Sahiwal District	Sahiwal City	28 (10.8)
32	Sargodha District	Sargodha City	140 (54.1)
33	Sheikhupura District	Sheikhupura City	22 (8.5)
34	Sialkot District	Sialkot City	121 (46.7)
35	Toba Tek Singh District	Toba Tek Singh City	09 (3.5)
36	Vehari District	Vehari City	12 (4.6)
36	Vehari District	Jallah Jeem City	5 (1.9)
