= Clare Turlay Newberry =

American writer

- Born: April 10, 1903; Enterprise, Oregon
- Died: February 12, 1970 (aged 66); San Diego, California
- Known for: Illustrator, Writer

Clare Turlay Newberry (April 10, 1903 – February 12, 1970) was an American writer and illustrator of 17 published children's books, who achieved fame for her drawings of cats, the subject of all but three of her books. Four of her works were named Caldecott Honor Books.

== Biography ==
Born in Enterprise, Oregon, she began drawing cats at the age of two and sold her first illustrations, a series of paper dolls, to the children's magazine John Martin's Book at age 16. She spent a year at the University of Oregon (1921–1922), then studied art at the School of the Portland Art Museum (1922–23) and the California School of Fine Arts (1923–24), but never finished her academic art training.

In 1930, she went to Paris to study at the Académie de la Grande Chaumière. The next year, in order to earn enough for passage to return to the US, she illustrated a story she had written before leaving for Paris, about a little girl named Sally who got a lion for her birthday. It was published as her first book, Herbert the Lion, to acclaim. The New York Times praised it as "refreshingly imaginative" and "full of high spirited nonsense".

She had hoped to become a portrait painter, but she abandoned this in 1934 for cat illustration. Her next book, Mittens, was the story of a six-year-old boy who posts an ad for his lost kitten. It became a bestseller and was named one of the Fifty Books of the Year by the American Institute of Graphic Arts. Her four Caldecott Honor Books were Barkis, about a sister jealous of a brother's new puppy, Marshmallow, about the relationship between a cat and a baby rabbit, April's Kittens, about a family with an extra kitten in an apartment that permits only one cat, and T-Bone the Babysitter, about a cat with spring fever. Her book Smudge was also one of the AIGA Fifty Books of the Year.

With the exception of Herbert the Lion and Lambert's Bargain, about the birthday gift of a hyena, Newberry's subjects were all drawn from life. In 1946, she purchased a month-old ocelot named Joseph for $500 from a sailor who brought it from Venezuela. The New York Times reported the news with the headline "Still A Lot For Ocelot". After using the ocelot, now dubbed Rufus, as a live drawing model, Newberry offered to give the ocelot away to a good home, but unfortunately Rufus died, possibly from a disease acquired from one of his many visitors or prospective owners.

The culmination of her works is expanded by the Clare Turlay Newberry Papers and consists of many works, such as an impressive 242 original drawing works. Along with this there is also other types of types of works that range from book ideas, sketches, and illustrations. They also include some of her earliest works in the form of scrapbooks from her early years of life.

== Bibliography ==
- Herbert the Lion (1931)
- Mittens (1936)
- Babette (1937)
- Barkis (1938), Caldecott Honors winner
- Cousin Toby (1939)
- April's Kittens (1940), Caldecott Honors winner
- Drawing a Cat (1940)
- Lambert's Bargain (1941)
- Marshmallow (1942), Caldecott Honors winner
- Pandora (1944)
- The Kittens ABC (1946, revised edition 1965)
- Smudge (1948), American Institute of Graphic Arts as one of the best in 1948
- T-Bone the Babysitter (1950), Caldecott Honors winner
- Percy, Polly, and Pete (1952)
- Ice Cream for Two (1953)
- Widget (1958)
- Frosty (1961)
