= April's Kittens =

1940 Picture book

- Author: Clare Turlay Newberry
- Publisher: Harper
- Publication date: 1940
- Pages: unpaged
- Awards: Caldecott Honor
- ISBN: 0060244003

April's Kittens is a 1940 picture book by Clare Turlay Newberry. When April's cat has three kittens problems arise. The book was a recipient of a 1941 Caldecott Honor for its illustrations.
