= Langah, Chakwal =

Langah لنگاہ
- Village
- Langah
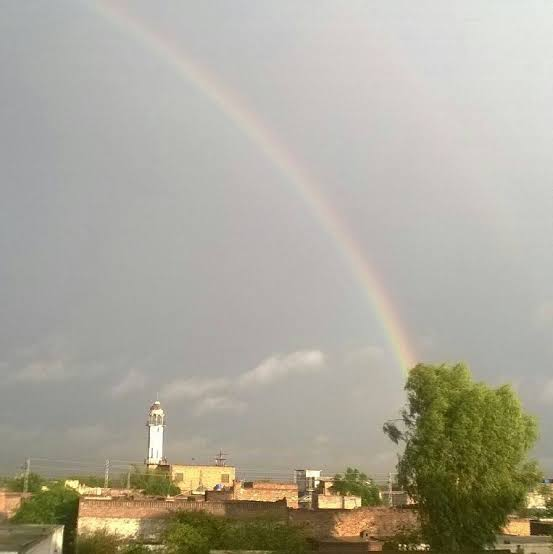

- Location of Langah Langah (Pakistan)
- Coordinates: 33.063358°N 73.099222°E
- Country: Pakistan
- Province: Punjab
- Tehsil: Chakwal
- Elevation: 498 m (1,634 ft)

Population (2017)
  - Urban: 4,415
- Time zone: UTC+5 (PKT)
- Postal code: 48800
- Dialling code: 0543 I
- Union council: Jand

Langah, (Urdu: لنگاہ), is a village in the Chakwal District of Punjab, Pakistan. It is a very old village. Langah is a village of UC Jand Awan on the eastern part of Chakwal, surrounded by Dhoda, Jand, Khessa, Dumali and Hasola.

== Demographics ==
The population of the village, according to 2017 census was 4,415.
