= Fozia Behram =

Pakistani politician

Fozia Behram is a Pakistani politician who had been a member of the National Assembly of Pakistan from August 2018 till January 2023. She is a former member of the Provincial Assembly of the Punjab from Chakwal for the Pakistan Peoples Party (PPP), serving from 1988–1993 and 2008–2013. She joined Pakistan Tehreek-e-Insaf (PTI) in 2015.
