= Qasemabad-e Cheshmeh Barqi =

Qasemabad-e Cheshmeh Barqi قاسم ابادچشمه برقي
- Village
- Location within Iran
- Coordinates: 33°50′41″N 48°16′45″E
- Country: Iran
- Province: Lorestan
- County: Selseleh
- Bakhsh: Central
- Rural District: Qaleh-ye Mozaffari

Population (2006)
  - Total: 101
- Time zone: UTC+3:30 (IRST)
  - Summer (DST): UTC+4:30 (IRDT)

Qasemabad-e Cheshmeh Barqi (Persian: قاسم ابادچشمه برقي, also romanized as Qāsemābād-e Cheshmeh Barqī; also known as Qāsemābād) is a village in Qaleh-ye Mozaffari Rural District, in the Central District of Selseleh County, Lorestan Province, Iran. At the 2006 census, its population was 101, in 16 families.
