= Dhok Manna =

- Village
- Location within Pakistan
- Country: Pakistan
- Province: Punjab
- District: Rawalpindi
- Tehsil: Gujar Khan
- Time zone: UTC+5 (PST)

Dhok Manna (Urdu: ڈھوک منہ) is a village in Rawalpindi District of Punjab province of Pakistan. It is located at 33°8'30" North, 73°10'20" East. Most of the population belong to the Gujjar and Kanyal tribe.
