= Hasola =

Historic Pakistani village

Coordinates: 33°03′N 73°05′E

Hasola is the oldest historic village in the immediate surroundings of Chakwal, Pakistan. The village's primary school was built in 1886, making it the oldest in the area.

The Middle School was built in 1913 and Government High School Hasola was built in 1950.

Lft. General Abdul Majeed Malik(r) and Lft. General Abdul Qayyom both attended these schools.
