= Barkis (children's book) =

1938 Picture book

- Author: Clare Turlay Newberry
- Publisher: Smithmark Publishers
- Publication date: 1938
- Pages: unpaged
- Awards: Caldecott Honor

Barkis is a 1938 picture book by Clare Turlay Newberry. The story is about a dog who does not get along with his family's cat. The book was a recipient of a 1939 Caldecott Honor for its illustrations.
