= Ayaz Amir =

Pakistani journalist, columnist, and politician

Member of the National Assembly of Pakistan
- In office 17 March 2008 – 16 March 2013
- Preceded by: Tahir Iqbal
- Succeeded by: Tahir Iqbal
- Constituency: NA-60 (Chakwal-I)

Member of the Provincial Assembly of Punjab
- In office 18 February 1997 – 1998
- Preceded by: Sardar Ghulam Abbas
- Constituency: PP-18 (Chakwal-III)

Personal details
- Born: Bhagwal, Chakwal District, Punjab, Pakistan
- Education: Pakistan Military Academy; Lawrence College

Ayaz Amir (Urdu: ایاز امیر) is a Pakistani journalist, analyst, columnist, former military officer, diplomat and politician. Previously, he had been a member of the Provincial Assembly of the Punjab in 1990s and a member of the National Assembly between 2008 and 2013.

In September 2022, Amir's son Shahnawaz was indicted by police for the murder of his wife, Sarah Inam.

== Early life ==
Ayaz Amir was born in Bhagwal, village of Chakwal. He received his education from Lawrence College, Murree and then joined Pakistan Military Academy as a cadet officer. He retired as a captain from the Pakistan Army and joined the foreign service.

In 1981, he was imprisoned again for five months.

== Political career ==
Ayaz Amir had been a part of the Pakistan People's Party (PPP) prior to joining PML-N. He then left PPP while it was in power in the late 80's and joined the PML (N) when it was in the opposition in early 2000. He was elected to the Provincial Assembly of the Punjab from Chakwal constituency in the 1997 Pakistani general election as a candidate of Pakistan Muslim League Nawaz (PML-N). He left the PML-N for a brief time in 1998 and later rejoined the party in 2002 and was active in a struggle to restore democracy to the country.

He was elected to the National Assembly of Pakistan from Constituency NA-60 Chakwal as a candidate of PML-N in the 2008 Pakistani general elections and achieved the highest number of votes in Pakistan, a record of over 125,000. In 2013, he applied for a PML-N ticket but was not granted one. He then left PML-N. In recent years, Ayaz has openly expressed his disillusionment with politics and believes that the political aspect of his life is now over.

In 2018, he was nominated by the Pakistan Tehreek-e-Insaf for the role of Care Taker Chief Minister of Punjab. In 2024, the jailed former Prime Minister Imran Khan sent a message to Ayaz Amir directing him to contest the general elections from Chakwal as the party had no candidate amidst the crackdown against it.

== Journalism career ==
Ayaz Amir started his career as a columnist for Dawn. His columns were initially known for being critical of the Pakistan Army’s role in politics; he has taken a softer approach in recent times proclaiming the Army of today to be a battle hardened and resilient Army and not the chocolate Army of yesteryears. He later wrote a column for The News International for many years before he developed differences with them and turned to writing his column in Urdu.

He has also hosted a talk show Counterpoint on ARY One World television. He currently appears as an analyst on the Pakistani TV channel Duniya News current affairs show called Think Tank.

== Assaulted ==
A day after attending a seminar hosted by Imran Khan, where Ayaz criticized Khan for giving an extension to the Army Chief Qamar Javed Bajwa and referring to the top brass in the army as "property dealers", Ayaz Amir got in his car to leave the studio of Dunya News, as he did so his car was stopped half way by unidentified men who dragged him out of his car, tore his clothes, and stole his phone and wallet.
