= Kanyal Bajrana =

Village in Punjab, Pakistan

- Village
- کنیال بجرانا
- Location within Pakistan
- Coordinates: 33°08′26″N 73°11′15″E
- Country: Pakistan
- Province: Punjab
- District: Rawalpindi

Kanyal Bajrana is a Village in Rawalpindi District, Punjab, Pakistan. Kanyal Bajrana is situated nearby to the localities Dhok Husang Daultala and Malkal.its part of Gujar Khan Tehsil.
