= Bhagwal, Chakwal =

Bhagwal بھگوال
- village
- Interactive map of Bhagwal
- Country: Pakistan
- Region: Punjab
- Division: Rawalpindi
- District: Chakwal
- Tehsil: Chakwal

Bhagwal is a village in the Chakwal District of Punjab, Pakistan. Located about 97 kilometers from national capital Islamabad, it lies at coordinates 33°4′31″N 72°35′45″E, with an elevation of 432 meters above sea level.

== Education ==
Bhagwal is served by several educational institutions, including the Government Higher Secondary School (GHSS) and the Government Elementary School (GES).

== History ==
Bhagwal is historically associated with the Mughal Kassar tribe, who settled in the area as landlords and tribal leaders. A prominent group within the tribe became known as the "Haveli Walay" due to their fortified ancestral residences.

During the Sikh period in Punjab (late 18th to mid-19th century), local oral history records that Mughal Kassar families in Bhagwal faced threats from Sikh raiders. In response, they erected a fort on the village's outskirts. The fort was later on destroyed because of an earthquake, however, it's foundations can still be seen today.

== Notable people ==
- Ayaz Amir: journalist and politician
