= Marshmallow (book) =

1942 Picture book

- Author: Clare Turlay Newberry
- Language: English
- Genre: Fiction
- Publisher: Harper & Brothers
- Publication date: 1942
- Publication place: United States
- Media type: Print
- Pages: 32 pages
- Awards: Caldecott Honor
- ISBN: 978-0060724887

Marshmallow is a 1942 picture book by Clare Turlay Newberry. The story is about the title character, a pet baby bunny named Marshmallow, and his new friend Oliver, a pet cat. The book was a recipient of a 1943 Caldecott Honor for its illustrations.

== Synopsis ==
Oliver is a cat who has never spent time with another pet before. He used to be the main attraction in his house. One day his owner Ms. Tilly decides to bring home a baby rabbit, Marshmallow. Oliver is not happy and tries to avoid Marshmallow all the time. Over the course of time Oliver becomes angry and begins acting aggressively towards Marshmallow. Ms. Tilly did not have any other choice than to lock them in separate rooms. But one day, Oliver manages to open the door to the room where Marshmallow was. Marshmallow was so happy and gives Oliver a kiss. In the end, both Oliver and Marshmallow become friends. In the end, Marshmallow is so happy and grateful that Ms. Tilly brought him home.

== See also ==
- 1942 in literature
