= Burki Budhal =

- Location within Pakistan
- Coordinates: 33.16°N 73.18°E
- Country: Pakistan
- Province: Punjab
- Elevation: 450 m (1,480 ft)
- Time zone: UTC+5 (PST)

Burki Budhal is a village in the Tehsil Gujar Khan District Rawalpindi of Pakistan. It is located at 33° 16' 5N 73° 18' 5E with an altitude of 450 metres (1479 feet). The village gets its name from the Budhal tribe, who make up the majority of the population.
