= Tahir Iqbal =

Pakistani politician

- طاہراقبال

Member of the National Assembly of Pakistan
- Incumbent
- Assumed office 29 February 2024
- Constituency: NA-58 Chakwal
- In office 1 June 2013 – 31 May 2018
- Constituency: NA-60 (Chakwal-I)
- In office 2002–2007
- Constituency: NA-60 (Chakwal-I)

Personal details
- Born: 15 May 1951 (age 75)
- Party: PMLN (2011-present)

Major Tahir Iqbal (Urdu: میجر طاہر اقبال; born 15 May 1951) is a Pakistani politician and former army officer who has been a member of the National Assembly of Pakistan and previously served in this position from 2002 to 2007 and again from June 2013 to May 2018.

== Early life ==
He was born on 15 May 1951.

He is a retired Major from the Pakistan Army.

== Political career ==
Iqbal was elected to the National Assembly of Pakistan as a candidate of Pakistan Muslim League (Q) from Constituency NA-60 (Chakwal-I) in the 2002 Pakistani general election. He received 72,331 votes and defeated Ayaz Amir, a candidate of the Pakistan Muslim League (N) (PML-N).

In November 2002, he was inducted into the federal cabinet of Prime Minister Zafarullah Khan Jamali and was appointed as the Minister of State (Incharge) for Environment where he remained until June 2004. In June 2004, he was inducted into the federal cabinet of Prime Minister Chaudhry Shujaat and was made Minister of State for Environment where he remained until August 2004. In August 2004, he was inducted into the federal cabinet of Prime Minister Shaukat Aziz and was made Federal Minister for Environment with the additional portfolio of Kashmir Affairs and Northern Areas.

He joined PML-N in 2011.

He was re-elected to the National Assembly as a candidate of PML-N from Constituency NA-60 (Chakwal-I) in the 2013 Pakistani general election. He received 130,821 votes and defeated an independent candidate, Sardar Ghulam Abbas.
