= Ahdi, Pakistan =

Ahdi
- Village
- Location within Punjab, Pakistan Location within Pakistan
- Village: Pakistan
- Province: Punjab (Pakistan)
- District: Rawalpindi

Government
- Time zone: UTC+5 (PST)
- Calling code: 0513

Adhi, also spelt as Ahdi, (Urdu:آھدى) is a village and Union Council in Gujar Khan Tehsil, in the Rawalpindi District of Punjab, Pakistan. Ahdi is located about 70 km south of Islamabad in the Pothwar region and nearest city is Daultala.

The village is rich in oil and natural gas reserves. Gas and oil exploration at Adhi began in 1956 and continued for a decade, during which four wells were drilled. But all of them were abandoned due to insurmountable high pressure formation water inflows and subsurface complications. Even today, hot water flows from one of the bores in Ahadi, in which people wash their clothes and take baths. The field is owned by Oil & Gas Development (50%), Pakistan Petroleum (39%) and The Attock Oil (11%). As of 2016, there were three plants at Adhi for processing natural gas. In 2024, production began from a new well.

The Adhi conventional gas field recovered 74.88% of its total recoverable reserves, with peak production in 2018. The peak production was approximately 8.87 thousand bpd of crude oil and condensate and 73 Mmcfd of natural gas. Based on economic assumptions, production will continue until the field reaches its economic limit in 2034. The field currently accounts for approximately 2% of the country's daily output.

The destruction caused by Ahdi Fields has affected the local environment and community. The underground water sources in Ahdi and surrounding areas have been polluted by the activities of the oil extraction operations, with a smell of oil now permeating the groundwater. The PPL Ahdi Field has polluted the underground water sources but they have made no effort to ensure the local population has access to clean water, leaving the people suffering from waterborne diseases. The heavy machinery used to transport oil wells from one site to another has damaged the local roads, making it difficult for the community to access resources. Despite the area's oil and gas reserves, including around 40 oil wells and a gas extraction plant, the locals face severe gas shortages. In 2020, pollution from the oil extraction operations affected the water supply in the nearby village of Nirali.
