= Narali =

- Town
- Location in Pakistan Narali (Pakistan)
- Coordinates: 33°07′N 73°10′E
- Country: Pakistan
- Province: (Punjab, Pakistan) Punjab
- Division: Rawalpindi
- District: Rawalpindi
- Tehsil: Gujar Khan

Population
  - Total: 15,353
- Time zone: UTC+5 (PST)

Narali (Urdu: نڑالى, Alternate spellings: Nirali) is one of the oldest and largest towns of Gujar Khan Tehsil, Punjab province of Pakistan. Narali used to be the hub of trade before partition. It had large Hindu and Sikh populations that dominated the trade circle. It still has a number of remains and ruins of Hindu culture and temples. It is culturally richer than the adjoining villages. Narali enjoys a very important position because it has union council office, patwarkhana, health centre and a post office.

Villages in Narali are mostly home to the Panwar and Sati Rajput clans most notably in the villages of Mohra Faryaal, Dhoke Cheemiyan and Dhoke Kayaal. The remaining villages in Narali consist of the following tribes: Cheemas (sub clan of Jut), Gujjars, Awans, Missaris, Masalli, Kaswis, Bhattis, Muhaajir and Absiri tribes. The Rajputs are addressed as Raja whilst the rest have adopted Chaudhry as there title.

== Villages ==
Narali Union Council consists of the following villages:

- Narali- Well known village home to around 3000 people. Most tribes from this clan are from Rajpoot (Gakhar, Kayani), Cheema, Jarral and Malik descent. Raja Sadiq Khan was a well known personality in this village who it is believed was the first to capture this area whilst it was under the Sikh rule in the 17th century.
- Taakhra- A village located in the central part of Narali that has a population of around 1000 people. The main tribe in this village was originally Thakurs who it is believed migrated from India in the 14th century. However, today the ancestral lineage of the current residing tribes are unknown and is disputed amongst many and therefore they have adopted Chaudhary as there title.
- Ahdi
- Dhoke Adra 1st
- Dhoke Adra 2nd
- Mohra Kaasvian - A village that holds a population of 700 on the outskirts of villages Tarati and Taakhra. Most people from this village are from the Kaasvi tribe and have spread across Narali due to the shortages in their village.
- Dhoke Cheemian 1st
- Dhoke Musalli
- Dhoke Budhal
- Dhoke Landian 1st
- Dhoke Landian 2nd
- Dhoong
- Tarati
- Faryal- One of the biggest villages in Narali This village is well known most notably as it was home to the great-grandparents of Raja Parvez Ashraf. Today the Faryal are still a strong clan descending from the Faryal Rajput clan and have provided many brave soldiers to the Pak Army.
- kalyal - A village dominated by the Rajput kalyal tribe.
- Fazolian
- Dhoke Baba Noor

Due to delimitation of constituencies in June 2015. Union council Narali is split into two councils (Narali and Ahdi). Final list of villages included in Narali will be added while confirmation from officials.
