= Daultala =

- Municipal Cometie
- Location within Punjab, Pakistan Location within Pakistan
- Coordinates: 33°15′33″N 73°18′18″E
- Country: Pakistan
- Province: Punjab
- District: Rawalpindi
- Tehsil: Gujar Khan

Government
  - MNA: Raja Pervaiz Ashraf
  - MPA: Raja Shoukat Aziz Bhatti

Population (2022)
  - Total: 79,009

Daultala (Urdu: دَولتالہ), is a City and Municipal Cometie located in Gujar Khan Tehsil, Rawalpindi District, Punjab, Pakistan. According to the 2023 Census, it has a population of 79,009.
