= Chakwal =

City in Punjab, Pakistan

Chakwal چکوال (Punjabi)
- City
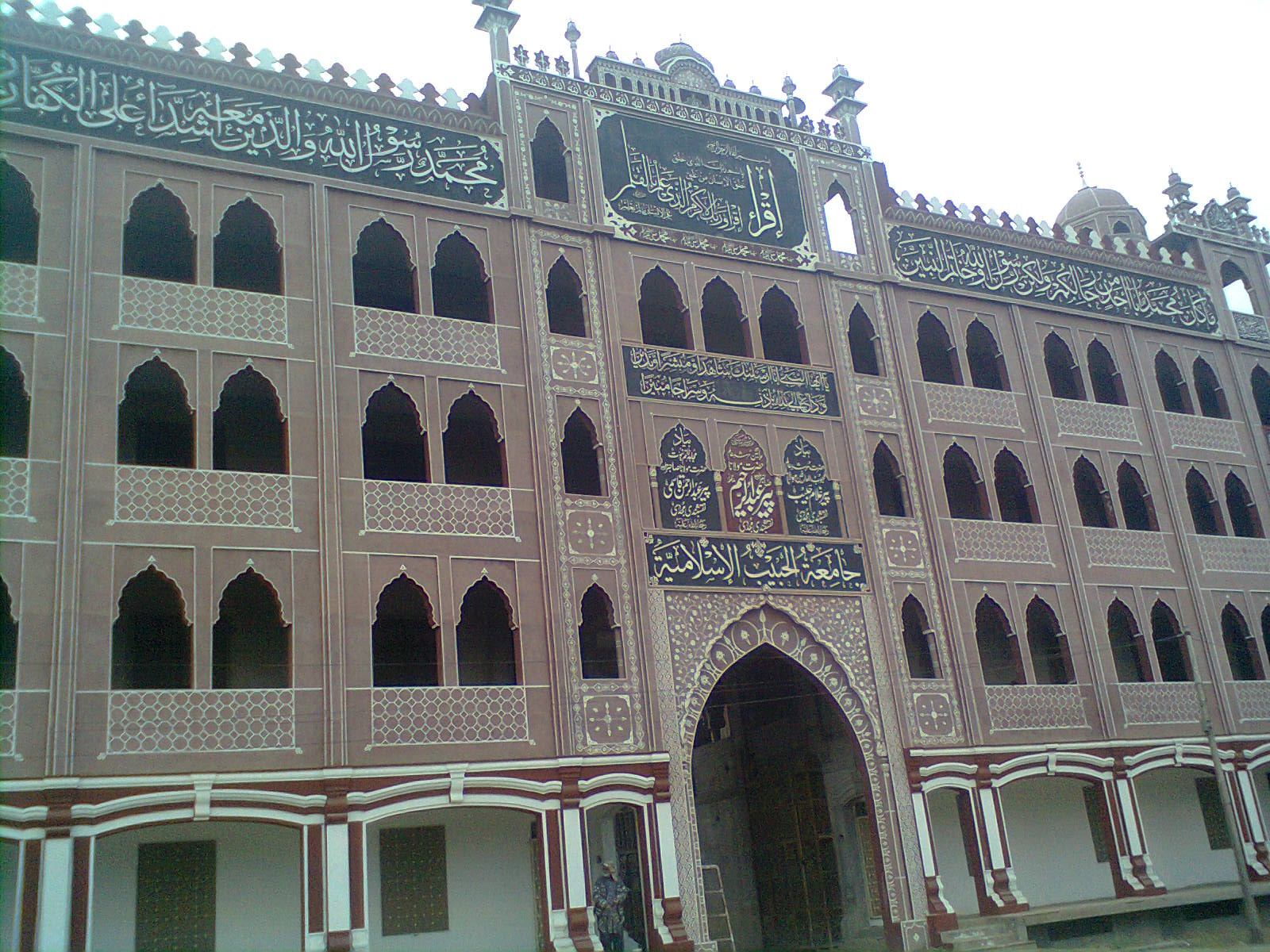
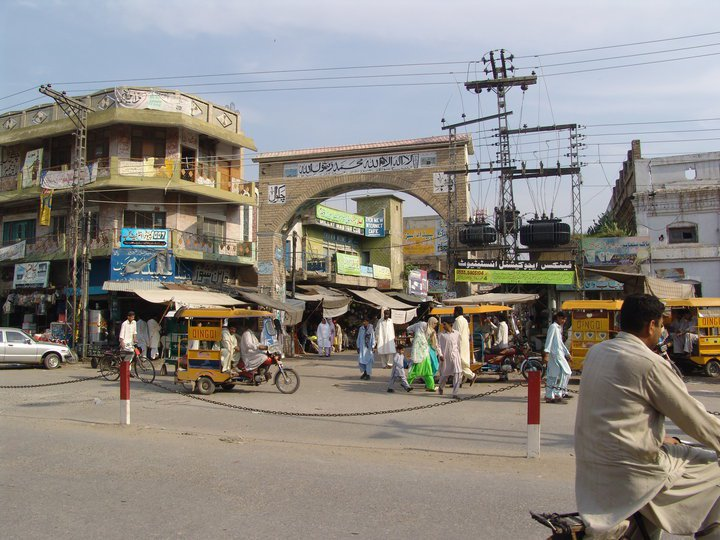
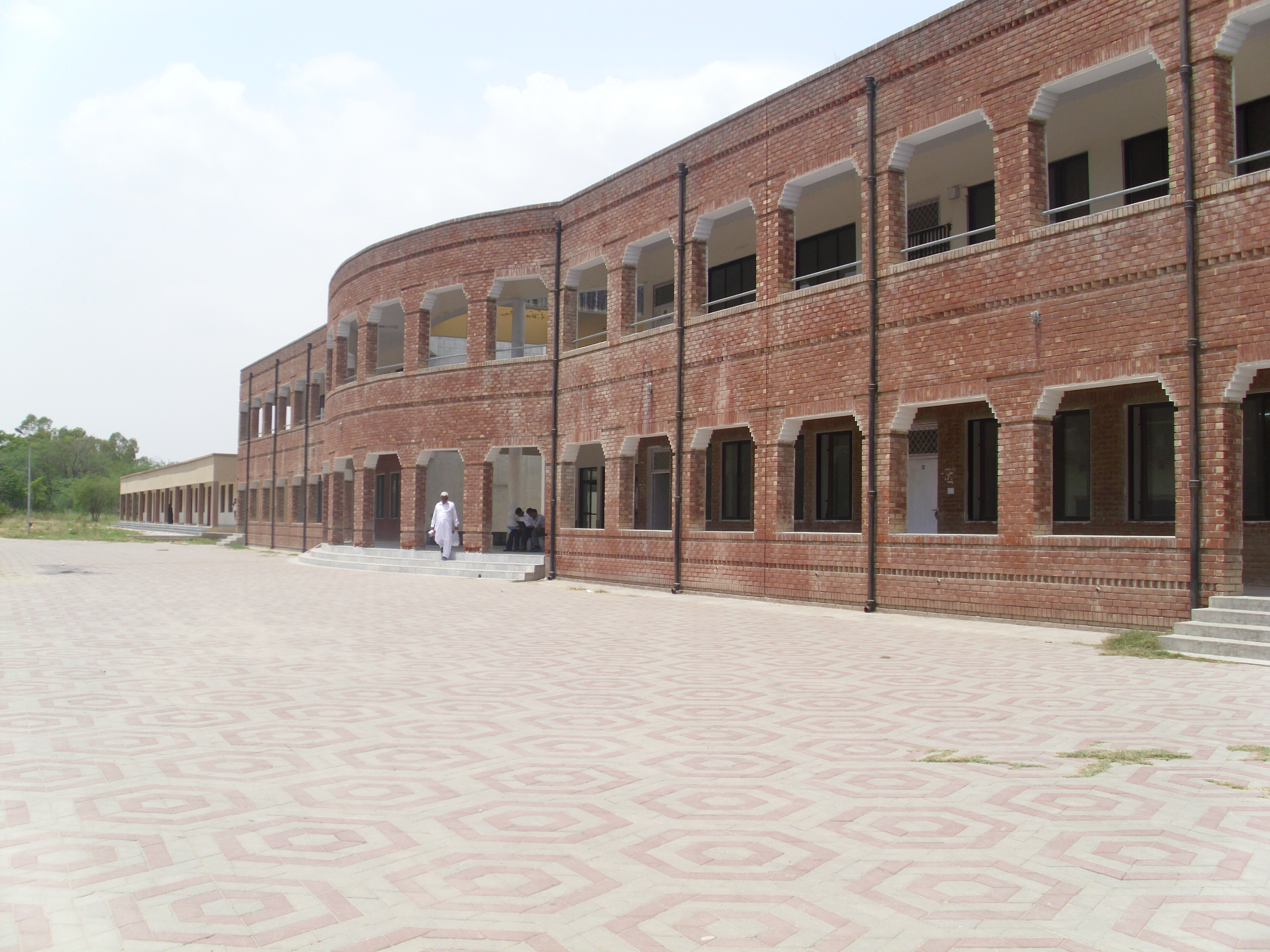
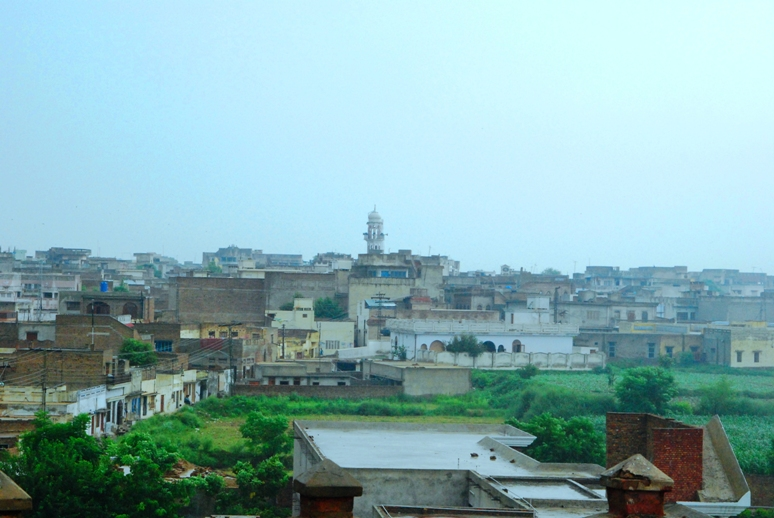

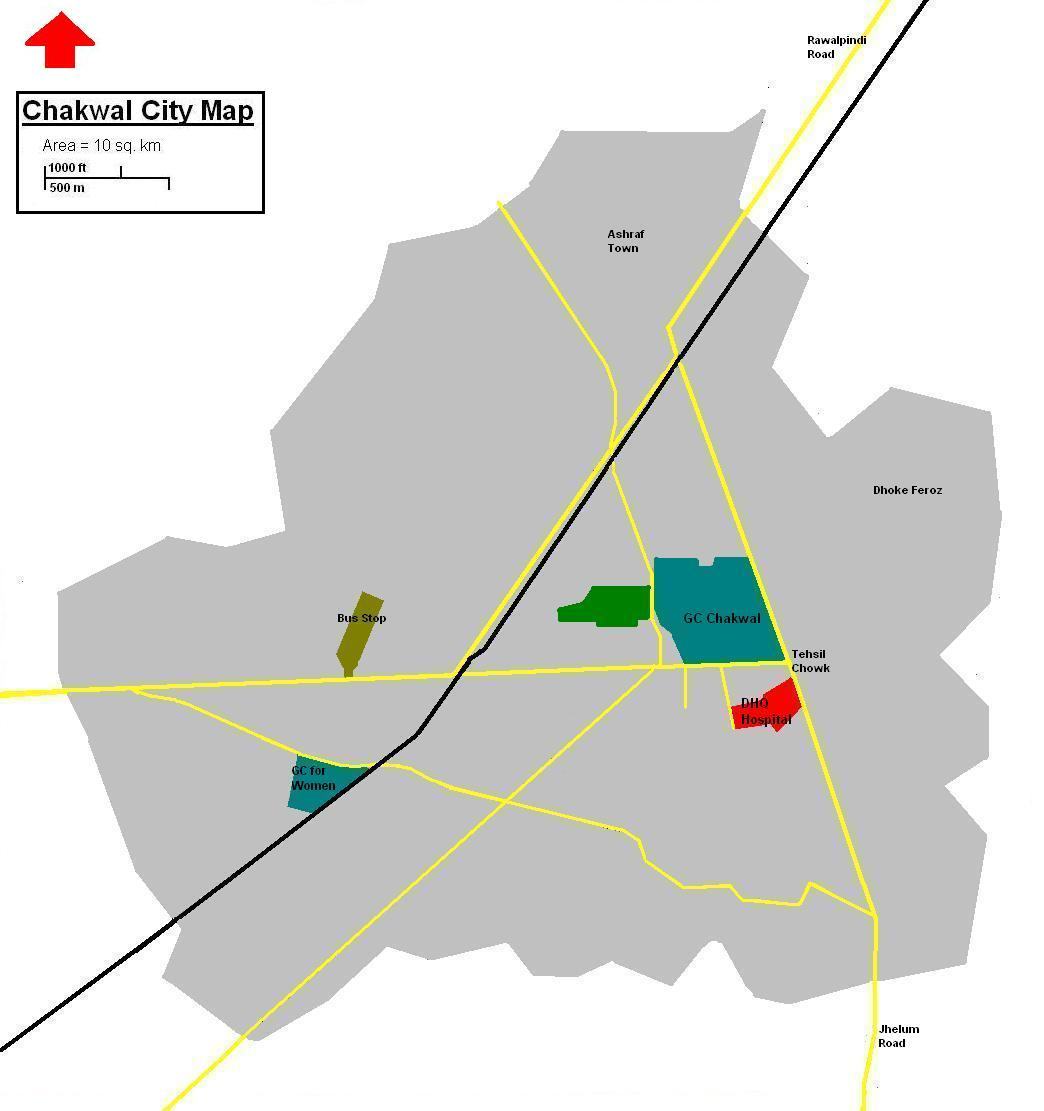
- Map of Chakwal city

- Location of Chakwal Chakwal (Pakistan)
- Coordinates: 32°55′49″N 72°51′20″E
- Country: Pakistan
- Province: (Punjab, Pakistan) Punjab
- Division: Rawalpindi
- District: Chakwal

Government
  - Type: Municipal Corporation
  - Mayor: (Vacant)

Population (2023)
  - City: 218,356
  - Rank: 48th, Pakistan
- Time zone: UTC+5 (PKT)
- Postal code: 48800
- Dialling code: 0543
- Number of Union councils: 5

Chakwal (Punjabi and Urdu: چکوال) is a city in Chakwal District in the Punjab province of Pakistan.

It is the 48th most populous city of Pakistan. Chakwal is located 90 kilometres (56 mi) south-west of the federal capital, Islamabad and 270 kilometres (170 mi) from the provincial capital, Lahore. It is accessible by both the Islamabad International Airport and the Lahore International Airport.

== Geography ==
Chakwal is part of the Pothohar Plateau region, with flat to gently undulating land broken up by gullies and low hill ranges. Chakwal's landscape features the canyons in Thirchak-Mahal. There are man-made and natural lakes around the city in neighbouring communities. The climate is semi-arid to sub-humid, with highly erratic rainfall patterns that occur during the monsoon season, ranging from 250 mm to 1500 mm annually. These variations often cause soil erosion and occasional flooding.

== Administration ==
Chakwal was created as an independent district of Rawalpindi in 1985 by combining sub division Chakwal of district Jhelum, sub division Talagang of district Attock and the police station Choa Saidan Shah, carved out of sub division Pind Dadan Khan of district Jhelum.

In addition to being the district headquarters, Chakwal city is also the administrative centre of Chakwal Tehsil (a subdivision of the district). The Chakwal District is divided into three tehsils: Kalar-Kahar, Choa Saidan Shah and Chakwal itself. The city of Chakwal itself is divided into five Union councils, and Chakwal district is divided into 68 union councils.

== Demographics ==
Population According to 2023 census, Chakwal had a population of 218,356. Details of the population at each census are shown below. (Note the 1901 census was done by colonial era authorities):

Historical population

| Year | Pop. | ±% p.a. |
|---|---|---|
| 1901 | 6,520 | — |
| 1951 | 13,310 | +1.44% |
| 1961 | 16,843 | +2.38% |
| 1972 | 29,143 | +5.11% |

| Year | Pop. | ±% p.a. |
|---|---|---|
| 1981 | 43,670 | +4.60% |
| 1998 | 80,508 | +3.66% |
| 2017 | 138,146 | +2.88% |
| 2023 | 218,356 | +7.93% |

Languages

Languages of Chakwal MC (2023 Census)
1. Punjabi (80.7%)
2. Pashto (12.4%)
3. Urdu (6.10%)
4. Others (0.80%)

=== Religion ===
Religious groups in Chakwal City (1881−2017) (Note: 1881-1941: Data for the entirety of the town of Chakwal, which included Chakwal Municipality.)
| Religious group | 1881 | | 1901 | | 1911 | | 1921 | | 1931 | | 1941 | | 2017 | |
| Religious group | Pop. | % | Pop. | % | Pop. | % | Pop. | % | Pop. | % | Pop. | % | Pop. | % |
|---|---|---|---|---|---|---|---|---|---|---|---|---|---|---|
| Islam | 3,279 | 57.36% | 3,853 | 59.1% | 3,834 | 59.91% | 4,442 | 59.82% | 5,585 | 58.53% | 6,684 | 56.48% | 136,235 | 98.57% |
| Hinduism | 2,045 | 35.77% | 1,946 | 29.85% | 1,310 | 20.47% | 1,878 | 25.29% | 2,461 (Note: 1931-1941: Including Ad-Dharmis) | 25.79% | 2,718 | 22.97% | 19 | 0.01% |
| Sikhism | 393 | 6.87% | 717 | 11% | 1,253 | 19.58% | 1,103 | 14.86% | 1,466 | 15.36% | 2,388 | 20.18% | —N/a | —N/a |
| Christianity | —N/a | —N/a | 4 | 0.06% | 3 | 0.05% | 2 | 0.03% | 30 | 0.31% | 40 | 0.34% | 1,935 | 1.4% |
| Ahmadiyya | —N/a | —N/a | —N/a | —N/a | —N/a | —N/a | —N/a | —N/a | —N/a | —N/a | —N/a | —N/a | 25 | 0.02% |
| Others | 0 | 0% | 0 | 0% | 0 | 0% | 0 | 0% | 0 | 0% | 5 | 0.04% | 0 | 0% |
| Total population | 5,717 | 100% | 6,520 | 100% | 6,400 | 100% | 7,425 | 100% | 9,542 | 100% | 11,835 | 100% | 138,214 | 100% |

== Economy ==
Much like the other semi-rural areas within Punjab, Chakwal has a predominantly agricultural economy, which includes a mix of livestock and crops, particularly wheat and peanuts (Arachis hypogaea, generally called groundnuts). Groundnuts are especially important for Pakistan's economy, as the country is the 7th largest producer of groundnuts in the world. Chakwal relies heavily on groundnut production because dryland crops serve as a key source of food security in semi-arid regions like this. However, the district's agricultural production suffers from a lack of modern farming practices and outdated technology, which leads to inefficient yields; farmers mainly rely on hand-sowing methods with little to no mechanization.

This agricultural economy, which is vital for both Chakwal and Pakistan as a whole, faces several natural, structural, and fiscal challenges. Farmers are highly dependent on irregular rainfall, which can cause significant crop and soil damage during periods of heavy precipitation. The region also experiences low levels of formal education, limiting the availability of skilled labor necessary for improved farming methods and mechanization. Poverty and socioeconomic inequality, caused by high population growth and unemployment, further contribute to the area's challenges. Women play an active role in agricultural labor but often have limited access to formal employment opportunities.

Chakwal's agricultural sector is also influenced by external factors, such as Pakistan's reliance on imported groundnuts from foreign producers like India. This influx of cheaper imported groundnuts lowers local market prices and discourages domestic production. Farmers and local organizations have called for government interventions to address these challenges and enhance agricultural productivity. One such proposed intervention involves expanding the value of groundnuts beyond their edible use by establishing groundnut oil extraction plants in Chakwal.

== Culture ==
Chakwal has a longstanding military tradition that predates the establishment of Pakistan. Economic hardship in the region led the British Army to recruit physically capable but unemployed workers; 460 residents were enlisted during World War I, and more followed in World War II. Several soldiers from Chakwal lost their lives during these conflicts and were awarded British honors, including the Victoria Cross. The area is marked by cannons, monuments, and memorials that commemorate these contributions. Some community members have expressed a desire for greater recognition of these sacrifices from Britain.

After the partition of the Indian subcontinent, Chakwal remained one of the key recruitment areas and continued to produce military personnel who served in the Pakistan Armed Forces. The region has become known for its military heritage, and several individuals from Chakwal have attained high-ranking positions, including generals such as Abdul Majeed Malik. Due to Pakistan's broader military culture, some soldiers from Chakwal, including Malik, have also held positions in political office.

== Notable people ==
- Sardar Ghulam Abbas, politician; Member of the National Assembly (2024–present), former Member of Provincial Assembly (1985–1988, 1993–1996), and District Nazim of Chakwal (2001–2009)
- Sub. Abdul Khaliq (23 March 1933 – 10 March 1988), Fastest Man of Asia, Flying Bird of Asia, Olympian, Pride of Performance (Presidential Award) holder
- Sukh Dev, Indian Organic Chemist
- Amir Gulistan Janjua, Governor of North West Frontier Province, Ambassador to Nepal, United Arab Emirates, Kingdom of Saudi Arabia.
- Ayaz Amir, journalist, columnist, and a senior politician
- Fozia Behram, politician
- Muhammad Akbar Khan, Highest ranking muslim officer of the British Indian Army and first muslim general of the Pakistan Army.
- Talib Chakwali (1900–1988), Indian Urdu poet
- Sadaf Hussain, cricketer
- Colonel Imam (died January 2011), member of Special Service Group (SSG) and Inter Services Intelligence (ISI) of Pakistan Army
- Sardar Zulfiqar Ali Khan Dullah, politician
- Iftikhar Khan (10 January 1907 – 13 December 1949), designated to become the first Commander-in-Chief of Pakistan Army, died in air crash.
- Khudadad Khan (20 October 1888 – 8 March 1971), was the first South Asian recipient of the Victoria Cross.
- Tikka Khan (10 February 1915 - 28 March 2002), architect of Operation Searchlight, COAS from March 1972 to March 1976.
- Muhammad Khan (1910 – 23 October 1999), veteran of World War II
- Nur Khan, Air marshal lead PAF during the Indo-Pakistan war of 1965
- Yahya Khan (4 February 1917 – 10 August 1980), third President of Pakistan
- Allah Bakhsh Malik, academic, researcher, development economist, social scientist, management and institutional development specialist
- Madan Mohan, music director of India
- Rafi Peer, playwright and actor
- Malik Munawar Khan Awan, Major rank officer in the Pakistan Army
- Lt. General Abdul Qayyum, retired three-star General
- Sahir Shamshad Mirza retired four-star general.
- Manmohan Singh, former Prime Minister of India
- Awais Zia, cricketer
- Mudassar Ali Khan, former Field Hockey Player of Pakistan and Olympian
- Faiz Hameed, 29th Director General of Inter-Services Intelligence

== See also ==
- List of Cities of Punjab, Pakistan by Area
