= Islamic banking and finance in Canada =

The demand for Islamic banking and finance has grown in Canada due to the growing Muslim population in the country who want to avoid riba and other financial practices in violation of sharia. These sharia-compliant financial products are not offered by main financial institutions and, thus, small financial companies are major players. However, major companies like WealthSimple are starting to embrace the idea. A growing number of Canadian fintech firms now offer Shariah-compliant home-financing models based on co-ownership (diminishing partnership) rather than conventional interest-bearing mortgages.

== History ==
A Toronto-based financial company UM Financial started giving Sharia-compliant loans to Muslims in 2005 in partnership with Central 1 Credit Union of Vancouver. The company planned to offer no-interest MasterCard as well. UM financial was ordered to go into receivership by the Ontario Superior Court on October 7, 2011. Omar Kalair and Yusuf Panchbaya of UM Financial were charged by RCMP for $4.3-million mortgage fraud, but both men were acquitted of all counts contained in the indictment in Ontario Superior Court June 7, 2019.

The 2024 federal budget announced on April 16 included plans to bring halal mortgages into financial regulatory system.

== Islamic financial products ==
=== Mortgage products ===
Comparison of Islamic Mortgage Products
Company	Islamic model	Year of Inception	Funder	Funding from Banks/ Credit Unions	Serving province	Sharia Standards	Sharia Certification	External Review	Website
EQRAZ	Commodity Murabaha	2022			Alberta; British Columbia; Manitoba; New Brunswick; Newfoundland and Labrador; Nova Scotia; Ontario; Prince Edward Island; Quebec; Saskatchewan	AAOIFI	Shariyah Review Bureau	Mufti Mirza Zain Baig (CCIRI)	
IjaraCDC Canada	Ijarah-wa-Iqtina	2008		Yes				AMJA Ebrahim Desai	
Aya Financial	Diminishing Musharakah			Yes	Ontario			Ebrahim Desai	
Zero Mortgage	Diminishing Musharakah			Yes				Ebrahim Desai	
Manzil	Murabaha	2019	Manzil Mortgage Fund	No	Ontario	AAOIFI (disputed)		Ebrahim Desai	
Manzil	DiminishingMusharakah	2019	Manzil Mortgage Fund	No		AAOIFI		Ebrahim Desai	
Canadian Halal Finance Corporation	Murabaha Diminishing Musharakah	2021			Alberta				
Halal Homes	Murabaha Diminishing Musharakah				Alberta				
Murabaha Homes	Murabaha								
An-Nur Co-operative			Co-operative						
Ansar Co-operative	Diminishing Musharakah	1980	Co-operative		Ontario			Ebrahim Desai	
Interest-Free Housing (Formerly ISNA Housing)		2008	Co-operative						
Al Ehsaan Housing	Diminishing Musharakah	2007	Co-operative		Saskatchewan				
Qurtuba Housing Coop	Diminishing Musharakah	1990	Co-operative		Quebec				
Assiniboine Credit Union	Diminishing Musharakah		Credit Union	Yes	Manitoba				

=== Investment products ===
Comparison of Investment Products
Product	Type	First year of offering	Company	Available through	MER	Sharia Certification	Website
Mackenzie Shariah Global Equity Fund	Mutual Fund	2024	Mackenzie	Assad Wealth Management	0.8	Rating Intelligence	Link
Wealthsimple Shariah World Equity Index ETF (WSHR)	Exchange-traded fund (ETF)	2020	WealthSimple		gold ETF 0.18%, equity ETF 0.5%	Ratings Intelligence	
Wahed FTSE USA Shariah ETF (HLAL)	Exchange-traded fund (ETF)	2019	Wahed Invest		0.5%		
The SP Funds S&P 500 Sharia Industry Exclusions ETF (SPUS)	Exchange-traded fund (ETF)	2019	SP Funds		0.49%		
SP Funds Dow Jones Global Sukuk ETF (SPSK)	Exchange-traded fund (ETF)		SP Funds				
The SP Funds S&P Global REIT Sharia ETF (SPRE)	Exchange-traded fund (ETF)		SP Funds				
Global Iman Fund (IMANX)	Mutual Fund	2008	Global Growth Assets				
Manzil Mortgage Fund (MANZL)	Mortgage Fund	2019	Manzil	Manzil/ CI Direct	1.5%		
Sukak - Term Deposit	Mortgage Fund	2019	AYA Financial	Moya Financial			

=== Roboadvisors/Investments Managers ===
Some institutions have started offering accounts including Registered Education Savings Plan (RESP), Registered Retirement Savings Plan (RRSP), Tax-Free Savings Account (TFSA) etc.

Comparison of Islamic Investment Service Providers
Company	First Year of Offering	Fees	Minimum Investment	External Review	Website
Assad Wealth Management at IG Wealth Management	2004	0.6% to 1.35%	$50,000		
Manzil (through CI Direct)	2019	0.6%			
ShariaPortfolio	2020	0.5 to 2%			
Wealthsimple Invest	2021	0.4 to 0.5%	No minimum		
Global Growth Assets	2008			Global News	
Canadian Islamic Wealth					

== See also ==
- Islamic banking and finance
- Islamic finance products, services and contracts
- Challenges in Islamic finance
- Accounting and Auditing Organization for Islamic Financial Institutions (AAOIFI)
