= Koho (fintech) =

Canadian neobank

KOHO Financial Inc.
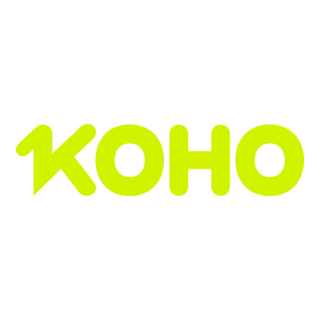
- Type: Private
- Industry: Financial services
- Founded: 2014; 12 years ago in Vancouver, British Columbia
- Founders: Daniel Eberhard, Mike Benna, Jonathan Bixby, Joshua Bixby
- Headquarters: Toronto, Ontario
- Website: www.koho.ca

Koho Financial Inc. (styled as KOHO) is a Canadian fintech company based in Toronto. While it is not a bank, the company is considered a neobank and provides banking services via Koho Financial Inc. pursuant to a license by Mastercard International Incorporated.

== History ==
Koho was founded in 2014 in Vancouver. In January 2015, the platform was launched, offering its services through its beta mobile app. The company partnered with Peoples Trust and Mastercard for its banking services with the company providing all of the APIs and User Interfaces.

Koho is not a member of Canada Deposit Insurance Corporation (CDIC), and not all deposits are insured; however, Koho accounts that earn interest are held in trust by CDIC-member institutions and funds would be returned to account holders by Peoples Trust in the event Koho fails.

Later in 2017, Koho moved its headquarters to Toronto, after again receiving investment from Portag3 Ventures.

In 2019, Koho was able to secure $25 million in second-round funding after successful growth and accumulating 120,000 accounts in Canada. In 2020, amid the COVID-19 pandemic, Koho partnered with the Canada Revenue Agency to allow their users to receive their emergency funds directly into their Koho accounts.

On August 19, 2020, Koho partnered with Manzil to launch the very first Halal Prepaid Mastercard program in Canada.

In 2024, Koho paired with Canada Post to allow its customers to make cash deposits into their Koho accounts via the post office. A few months later, in November 2024, Canada Post confirmed that it had partnered with Koho to bring back postal banking, by offering chequing and savings accounts. Initially, Canada Post employees will be given early access to test the functionality of the accounts offered; with Canada-wide public access planned for 2025.

In May 2025, the company launched international money transfers, with the ability to send remittances, or international money transfers, to over 190 countries.

On June 11, 2026 KOHO Financial announced that it raised $130 million and thus soon becomes a new federally regulated Schedule 1 bank. That is, KOHO Financial will hold the same legal status as the Big Six banks in Canada and will have the ability to hold client deposits directly.

== Awards and distinctions ==
- Nasdaq FinTech Innovation Award (2015)

== See also ==
- Neobank
