= Islamic banking in Libya =

Islamic banking in Libya is the provision of Islamic banking services in the North African country of Libya which is a majority Muslim country. As a Muslims country the laws are bent to the Islamic religion and Sharia law. Despite this Islamic banks are not well supported in the country.

The challenges in Islamic finance for all Muslim countries is to provide loans without charging interest. To provide loans without interest that could provide funding in the short term banks are faced with the problem of financing of consumer loans and the government deficit. All Sharia based Libyan banks have resorted to financing that delivers a predetermined return on investment to avoid the increased risk of short-term financing, and banks have only changed the name of their transactions. Banks that are based on the Sharia law do not have the support of the central Bank of Libya, and suffer from a lack of trained staff.

== History ==
The idea of changing commercial banks to Islamic banks was instituted in the 20th century. The development of the banking system in Libya was a key objective and was treated with great importance as it was crucial in the future of the economy. It relied heavily on the State and its various institutions, particularly the Central Bank to activate this development to create a legislative environment to suit the latest developments in international banking, especially in light of globalization and global economic liberalization. The development of Islamic banks has met with stunted growth in Libya, primarily because these banks were founded with the idea of non interest service facilities which caused funding difficulties for the banks.
