= Faith-based marketing =

Marketing strategy based on appeal to religious customers

Faith-based marketing is the integration of religious faith into marketing and business. Such agencies specialize in marketing faith-based products and creating partnerships that target specific groups, such as the family-based audience. In the United States this type of marketing can help reach Christians, who enjoy an estimated purchasing power of over $5.1 trillion a year. Marketing research conducted by Nokia has shown that one of the most-desired features that adherent Muslims look for in cell phones is a Qibla finder that will orient them towards Mecca during prayer. As the desire for religion-on-demand grows, more modern, technologically advanced products are being designed to help believers maintain traditional religious practices. Faith-based design allows companies to reach strong existing markets in new ways.

== Market segments ==
=== Christian ===
Inspire Investing and Timothy Plan offer mutual funds and exchange traded funds aimed at American evangelical Christians. Global X ETFs has two ETFs catered to Catholic investors.

Many Christian book and music titles have become successes in the mainstream world. The best-selling Purpose Driven Life by Christian pastor Rick Warren became the bestselling hardback non-fiction book in history, and is the second most-translated book in the world, after the Bible. In 2004, the Mel Gibson-directed The Passion of the Christ opened to $83.8M domestically and went on to gross $611M worldwide. In 2014, the Christian films Son of God, Noah, Heaven Is for Real and God's Not Dead, enjoyed box-office success. Faith-based marketing is also seen in the tourism industry. The UN World Tourism Organization estimates that 300 million to 330 million people a year participate in faith-based travel. The U.S. Travel Association reports that 25% of all travelers are interested in a spiritual vacation.

Many companies incorporate faith-based ideas in their operations, mission statements, or even their packaging, subtly or overtly.

=== Islamic ===
See Islamic banking and finance, or the Dow Jones Islamic Fund for investing alighted with Islamic principles.

=== Judaism ===
With the rise of controversial anti-semitism in 2022 into 2023, billboards to market and advertise Jewish teaching have been placed on display. In Los Angeles, California, between the intersections of Pico and Hauser Blvd until Venice and Lincoln Crossing, billboards featuring Jewish texts and teachings were placed to be visible by many drivers. The billboards were sponsored by the Jewish Federation of Greater Los Angeles and in partnership with Outfront Media. The billboards signs were placed in December of 2022 in line with Hanukkah.

== Costs of faith-based marketing ==
Efforts to market or run a business based on religious faith can face unique challenges.

In 2012, Chick-fil-A, who has "made a name [for itself] promoting Christian principles in its charity work", drew controversy after its CEO Dan Cathy suggested that he opposed same-sex marriage, which led to protests. Those protests did not appear to damage the company's sales. Hobby Lobby, another Christian business, filed a lawsuit, now styled Sebelius v. Hobby Lobby, arguing that the Patient Protection and Affordable Care Act's mandate for coverage of emergency contraception violated their First Amendment, religious rights. Oral arguments were heard by the Supreme Court of the United States in March 2014.
