= Epic Burger =

American restaurant chain

- Type: Fast casual restaurant
- Industry: Fast casual
- Founded: 2008; 18 years ago in Chicago, Illinois
- Founder: David Friedman
- Headquarters: Chicago, Illinois, United States
- Number of locations: 9 (2026)
- Key people: David Grossman (CEO)
- Revenue: $8.2 million (2016)
- Owners: David Grossman (51%); Cue Ball Capital (49%)
- Subsidiaries: Meatheads Burgers & Fries
- Website: www.epicburger.com

Epic Burger is an American fast-casual retailer of high-end hamburgers and other related menu items based in Illinois. The chain was founded by David Friedman in 2008.

In September 2020, now-CEO David Grossman bought a 51% stake in the company. In 2023, Epic Burger bought Meatheads Burgers & Fries and began the process of converting locations to the Epic Burger brand. This process first saw the Northbrook location converted, followed by the Naperville location. When this process completed, Epic Burger's location count stood at 11 restaurants.

In 2025, the Bloomington and Champaign locations, both formerly Meatheads, closed.
