= Faith-based =

Faith-based may refer to:

- Faith-based organization
- Faith-based marketing
- Faith-based community organizing
- Faith-based school
- White House Office of Faith-Based and Neighborhood Partnerships
- Faith Based (film), a 2020 film directed by Vincent Masciale

== See also ==
- Faith Based Initiative (disambiguation)
