= Challenges in Islamic finance =

Difficulties of providing finance without violating sharia

Challenges in Islamic finance are the difficulties in providing modern finance services without violation of sharia (Islamic law).

Islamic finance has faced criticism both from within its community and from external observers. A primary concern is that conventional Islamic financial institutions often fail to fully implement the core principle of profit and loss sharing (PLS) financing. Supporters contend that these institutions sometimes resort to hiyal, legalistic maneuvers considered ethically questionable in Islam, to circumvent the spirit of PLS.

The industry of Islamic banking and finance has developed around avoiding riba (unjust, exploitative gains made in trade or business) by avoiding interest.

The majority of Islamic banking clients are found in the Gulf states and in developed countries that are in the Muslim world. The challenges include that interest rate benchmarks have been used to set Islamic "profit" rates so that "the net result is not materially different from interest based transactions". giving the impression that Islamic banking is "nothing but a matter of twisting documents ....".

The religiously preferred mode of Islamic finance is profit and loss sharing (PLS) but this causes several issues including that it must wait for the project invested in to come to fruition before profits can be distributed and increases the risk and complexity for financial providers.

== Reception ==
The industry has been praised for turning a "theory" into an industry that has grown to about $2 trillion in size; for attracting banking users whose religious objections have kept them away from conventional banking services, drawing non-Muslim bankers into the field, and (according to other supporters) introducing a more stable, less risky form of finance.

However, the industry has also been criticized for ignoring its "basic philosophy" and moved in the wrong direction over the decades—leading both outsiders and rank and file Muslims to question it. This has happened first by the sidelining the original finance method advocated by promoters—risk-sharing finance—in favor of fixed-markup finance of purchases (particularly murabaha), and then by distorting the rules of that fixed-markup murabaha, effectively delivering conventional cash interest loans following conventional interest rates, but disguised with "ruses and subterfuges" and burdened with "higher costs, bigger risks".

Other issues/complaints raised include a lack of effort by the industry to help small traders and the poor; the question of how to deal with inflation, late payments, the lack of hedging of currencies and rates or sharia-compliant places to park short term funds for liquidity; the non-Muslim ownership of much of Islamic banking, and the concentration of what ownership is in Muslim hands.

== Compliments and defense ==
According to Muhammad Taqi Usmani, a leading scholar in contemporary Islamic finance, Islamic finance has turned a "theory" into "a reality", "asserting" Islam into international financial markets. It has "enriched" the Islamic legal system with shariah-compliant solutions developed in response to the practical business questions put to it by the industry. Abayomi A. Alawode, head of Islamic finance for the World Bank, praises it as "ethical, sustainable, environmentally- and socially-responsible", emphasizing "financial inclusion and social welfare". Its popularity has drawn conventional banks into Islamic finance in search of Muslim customers. (Note: "Another achievement of Islamic banking may be gauged from the fact that many conventional banks have also started using Islamic banking techniques in the conduct of their business, particularly in dealing either with Muslim clients or in dominantly Muslim regions.")

Positive sum effect

A study on the size and market share of Shariah-compliant Islamic banking in Muslim countries found "strong and consistent empirical evidence" that the development of Islamic banking leads to "higher banking sector development" rather than attracting money and existing customers away from conventional banking as measured by "the amount of private credit or bank deposits scaled to GDP."

Stability

Proponents (such as Zeti Akhtar Aziz, the head of the central bank of Malaysia) have argued that Islamic financial institutions are more stable than conventional banks because they forbid speculation and their two main types banking accounts—"current account" and mudarabah accounts—carry less risk to the bank. This is because in a current account the customer (in theory) earns no return and (in theory) the bank is not supposed to invest the account funds. The alleged stability in a mudarabah account comes from the smaller risk of loan defaults because that risk is shared with the depositor. If the borrower cannot pay back part or all of the money lent to them by the bank, the amount going to the depositor is cut by an equivalent amount, whereas in a conventional bank the depositor is given fixed interest payments whether or not the bank's earnings decline from loan defaults. Ibrahim Warde credits the supervision of Shariah Boards for preventing Islamic banking from following the following conventional banks into the excesses that led to the 2008 financial crisis.

Defence

While the industry has problems and challenges, these can be explained by the

1. industry's relative youth and its position in the early stages of a "learning curve" that will solve the challenges over time; (In 1993 Ausaf Ahmad defended the industry as early in its transition from conventional banking.)
2. unless and until the industry operates in an Islamic society and environment it will be hindered by non-Islamic influences and won't "operate in its essence".

== Customers and the industry ==
The majority of Islamic banking clients are found in the Gulf states and in developed countries. Studies of Islamic banking customer in Malaysia and Pakistan found customer satisfaction was connected to service quality. A study of Islamic banking customers in Bangladesh found "most customers" between 25–35 years, "highly educated" and having a "durable relationship" with the bank, more knowledgeable about account than financing products.

In series of interviews conducted in 2008 and 2010 with Pakistani banking professionals (conventional and Islamic bankers, Shariah banking advisors, finance-using businessmen, and management consultants), economist Feisal Khan noted many Islamic bankers expressed "cynicism" over the difference or lack thereof between conventional and Islamic bank products, the lack of requirements for external Shariah-compliance audits of Islamic banks in Pakistan, shariah boards lack of awareness of their banks' failure to follow shariah compliant practices in or their power to stop these practices. However this did not deter patronage of the banks by the pious (one of whom explained that if his Islamic bank was not truly shariah compliant, "The sin is on their head now, not on mine! What I could do, I've done.")

One estimate of customer preference (given by a Pakistani banker) in the Pakistani banking industry, was that about 10% of customers were "strictly conventional banking clients", 20% were strictly Shariah-compliant banking clients, and 70% would prefer Shariah-compliant banking but would use conventional banking if "there was a significant pricing difference". A survey of Islamic and conventional banking customers found Islamic banking customers were more observant (having attended hajj, observing salat, growing a beard, etc.), but also had higher savings account balances than conventional bank customers, were older, better educated, had traveled more overseas, and tended to have a second account at a conventional bank. (Note: Survey of 5133 bank customers of 30 branches of an Islamic and a conventional bank led by Ayesha Khalid Khan) Another study, using "official data" reported to State Bank of Pakistan, found that for lenders who had taken out both Islamic (Murabaha) financing and conventional loans, the default rate was more than twice as high on the conventional loans. Borrowers were "less likely to default during Ramadan and in big cities if the share of votes to religious-political parties increases, suggesting that religion—either through individual piousness or network effects—may play a role in determining loan default." (Note: a study of "conventional and Islamic loans using a comprehensive monthly dataset from Pakistan that follows more than 150,000 loans over the period 2006:04 to 2008:12".)

== Challenges, industry view ==
"Key challenges" to the Islamic finance industry as a whole—including sukuk—as of 2016 (according to the State of the Global Islamic Economy Report, 2015/16 and the IMF) include

- "Low levels" of awareness and understanding of Islamic finance products and services among the public, leading them to not patronize these products and services;
- A need for "increased regulatory clarity and harmonization, better cooperation between Islamic and conventional financial standard-setters, and further improvement of supervisory tools", to deal with the "complex financial products and corporate structures" in some countries/jurisdictions brought about by "regulatory and supervisory frameworks" that do not "address the unique risks of the industry";
- A "scarcity of Shariah-compliant monetary policy instruments" and a lack of understanding of "the monetary transmission mechanism";
- "Underdeveloped" safety nets and resolution frameworks. A lack of complete Islamic deposit insurance systems where premiums are invested in Shariah-compliant assets, or Shariah-compliant "lenders-of-last-resort";
- Regulators who "do not always have the capacity (or willingness) to ensure Shariah compliance."

== Challenges, questions of shariah compliance ==
=== Imitation of conventional finance ===
A number of supporters (such as Taqi Usmani, D.M. Qureshi, Saleh Abdullah Kamel, Harris Irfan) and skeptics (Muhammad Akram Khan, Muhammad O. Farooq, Feisal Khan, Mahmoud El-Gama, Timur Kuran) of Islamic banking have examined the differences between Islamic and conventional banking and lamented their similarity.

Taqi Usmani argues Islamic banking has "totally" neglected its "basic philosophy", first by ignoring modes of risk-sharing between the financer and the user of finance (Musharaka), in favor of the fixed markup mode of murabahah and ijarah, which in theory should only be used when risk-sharing is impractical. (Note: Example of the lack of risk-sharing in murabaha: "As the Council of Islamic Ideology Report recognises, in murabaha there is 'the possibility of some profit for the banks without the risk of having to share in the possible losses, except in the case of bankruptcy or default on the part of the buyer.') Then by ignoring the rules of murabahah and ijarah themselves, by, for example, using murabahah finance to borrow cash and not even purchasing a commodity in the process, (see also Ignoring required commodities below) or using ijarah (leasing) without the "lessor either assuming "the liability for his ownership" or offering "any usufruct to the lessee".

Interest rate benchmarks have been used to set Islamic "profit" rates so that "the net result is not materially different from interest based transactions". Ignoring basic principles such as these has weakened the case for Islamic Banking "before non-Muslims" and "before the masses especially", who Usmani believes, have now gotten the impression that Islamic banking is "nothing but a matter of twisting documents ...."

In March 2009, Usmani declared that 85% of Sukuk, or Islamic bonds, were "un-Islamic". (At the time Usmani was chairman of the board of scholars of the Accounting and Auditing Organization for Islamic Financial Institutions, or AAOIFI, which sets standards for the global Islamic Banking industry). Others (Hassan Heikal) have also criticized the authenticity of sukuk.

Another "pioneer" of Islamic banking, D.M. Qureshi, told questioners at a 2005 Islamic banking conference, (Note: the First Pakistan Islamic Banking and Money Market Conference) that "Islamic banking as it stands today is, with all due respect and humility, a labeling industry. Everything that is conventional is being labeled and you say it is Islamic."

Mohammad Najatuallah Siddiqui, also attacks the tendency to duplicate conventional interest-based financial instruments with certain modifications in terms and phrases, (sukuk for bond and tawarruq for loan, example) which gives a bad name to Islamic finance. One Islamic bank—Lariba—has gone so far as to publish a fatwa from a Sharia committee (whose membership included the widely known Sheikh Yusuf al-Qaradawi) including the statement "we have reached a consensus that there is no objection to using the term 'interest' as an alternative to the term 'profit' or 'rate of return'." Practitioners of Islamic Finance aspired "in theory" to prove their finance "was different from the conventional" sort, Siddiqui states, but were actually

"busy searching for ways to make it similar to it. ... Starting sometime during nineteen eighties, Shariah advisors focused mainly on designing Shariah-compliant substitutes for financial products with which market was familiar."

One Muslim banker at Deutsche Bank (Harris Irfan) writing about his efforts to sell Islamic banking products he felt failed to be truly Shariah complaint, complained of feeling like a "charlatan", suffering from "incoherent pietism" and "cognitive dissonance" trying "to squeeze a square peg into a round hole".

A veteran of Islamic economics, Muhammad Akram Khan, criticizes Islamic banking as professing to have "put its business on a basis other than interest" while devising "a whole host ruses and subterfuges to conceal interest."

Mahmoud Amin El-Gamal, (Note: a professor of economics at Rice University (United States)) and Mohammad Fadel complain of the charging of higher fees in Islamic banking. Fadel characterizes the basis of the industry as the "extraction of fees" for creating a financial product that seems to "comply with the formal requirements of Islamic law", while "retaining all the economic features of that conventional product."

El-Gamal has described modern Islamic finance as "Shari’a arbitrage" (i.e. it uses the price difference between the Islamic and conventional markets—pious Muslims being willing to pay a premium for what they believe to be sharia compliant finance), whereby the bank's Shariah board earns its fees by "finding an appropriate [classical] Arabic name for the Islamic analog product" and uses the name to "justify and lend credibility to the Islamic brand name."

According to Sayyid Tahir,

"there is no evidence that the arrangements for the Islamic banks have been developed on some Shariah basis. For example, the formulas for SLR (statutory liquidity requirements), capital adequacy ratio, and risk management standards are same for Islamic banks as those for interest-based banks."

According to A. W. Duskuki and Abdelazeem Abozaid, "the only difference" an examiner may find between Islamic and conventional finance is:

"in the technicalities and legal forms, while in essence, the substance is the same .... In fact Islamic bankers use the same financial computation just like other bankers to calculate present and future values of investments. Hence, at the end of the day, unconvinced Muslim and other critical outsiders, observe that Islamic banks in reality keep interest but just call it by another name, such as commissions or profits ..."

Saleh Abdullah Kamel, winner of the 1997 IDB Prize in Islamic Banking, is somewhat less critical than others, stating that the industry has only "most" of the characteristics of conventional banking,

the preferred investment patterns of Islamic banks have become a mix of a loan and an investment. It is a mix which has most of the characteristics of a riba-based loan and the flaws of the Western capitalist system. It fails to highlight the features of Islamic investment based on risk-sharing and real investment. It does not recognize the guarantee of the capital or its return.

Another criticism of imitating conventional banking (made by Mahmoud El-Gama) is that pursuing the "past returns and past trends" of conventional finance, (for example seeking to be the first to offer an "Islamic hedge fund"), offers the large initial profit margins from being the "first-movers" of the financial product (in the Islamic financial industry) and having "access to captive markets and free indirect publicity", which tempt other banks try and follow suit, but often offer limited long-term returns.

Explanations

Skeptics of the industry have proposed explanations for what they see as its failure to provide a true alternative to conventional banking. The pressure on Shari'ah boards to approve the products of institutions that pay their salaries (serving as a sort of modern-day equivalent of the medieval "court ulama") is part of the problem according to M.O. Farooq. (Note: M.O. Farooq cites Monzer Kahf as pointing out how the shariah board of one bank (Bank al Taqwa) defended that bank's management after its failure in 1998 "stating that ... the board of directors and the management did their best and took sound finance and investment decisions", when in fact the management had "invested in one single project more than 60 per cent bank's assets .... in violation of well-established banking rules".)

Feisal Khan describes Islamic banking as caught in a "vicious circle" where conventional piety clashes with feasibility. A large market of pious Muslims, inspired by the Islamic revival, seek to finance, invest, and save, in ways that do not use interest and "the standard debt-contract". Efforts to provide truly Shariah-compliant substitute for interest—"participatory" or "profit and loss sharing" financing"—fail because "in most situations" there is an asymmetry of information between in the financer and financee, making this mode of finance unprofitable. Not willing to let this obstacle stand in the way of cashing in on a huge market of pious Muslims, major banks then look "for scholars willing to certify conventional instruments as being Shariah-compliant," rewarding the most accommodating scholars with more business. The result is "a fairly wide" range of financial products and services that "closely" mimic conventional ones, but come with Sharia certification adding an additional layer of transaction costs.

Another explanation offered by Farooq (quoting Mohammad Nejatullah Siddiqi) are the shortcomings of sharia experts. These "generally speaking", do not have adequate training in maqasid (intent or purpose) of shariah, leaving them unable to evaluate the masalih (benefits) and mafasid (harms) of some financial products; nor do they the economic training to conduct the necessary analysis of what the consequences would be of widespread use of complex financial transactions such as tawarruq (which allows cash to be lent to a borrower with "shariah compliance" but with greater complexity and cost than with a conventional loan).

Timur Kuran explains the salience of the Islamic economic foundation of Islamic banking as being "primarily a vehicle for reasserting the primacy of Islam" and only "secondarily a vehicle for radical economic change".

=== Profit and Loss Sharing and its problems ===
Islamic banks at least in Saudi Arabia and Egypt have "departed from using profit-loss-sharing (PLS) techniques as a core principle of Islamic banking", according to a 2006 dissertation by Suliman Hamdan Albalawi. Malaysia has also seen a decline. (Note: In Malaysia, another study found the share of musharaka financing declined from 1.4% in 2000 to 0.2% in 2006,)

One study of which modes of Islamic finance were used most frequently found PLS financing in leading Islamic banks had declined from 17.34% in 1994-6, to only 6.34% of total financing from 2000 to 2006. "Debt-based contracts" or "debt-like instruments" were far more popular in the sample. 54.42% of financing was on the basis of murabaha, 16.31% on the basis of ijara and 5.60% on the basis of salam and istisna during 2004-6. Another survey of the largest Islamic banks published in 2010 found PLS use ranging from between 0.5% and 21.6%.

Explanations (offered by two authors, Humayon A. Dar and J.R. Presley), for why PLS instruments—namely mudaraba and musharaka financing—have declined to almost negligible proportions include:

1. There is a strong incentive for the bank's client to report less profit than is actually earned, because the higher the declared profit, the more of the client's money will go to the financing bank. This puts the use of PLS at a disadvantage to fixed income modes for a bank.
2. Property rights in most Muslim countries are not properly defined, which makes the practice of profit-loss sharing difficult.
3. The conventional banks Islamic banks compete with are firmly established and have centuries of experience. Islamic banks are not yet sure of their policies and practices and feel restrained in taking unforeseen risks.
4. The PLS is not suitable or feasible in many cases such as short-term resource requirement, working capital needs, non-profit-generating projects such as in the education and health sectors.
5. In some countries interest is considered a business expenditure and given tax exemption, but profit is taxed as income. Thus clients of the business who obtain funds on a PLS basis have to bear the financial burden in terms of higher taxes they would not if they took out a loan and paid interest.
6. There were, (at least as of 2001), no secondary markets for Islamic financial products based on PLS.
7. Mudaraba, one of the forms of PLS, provides limited control rights to shareholders of the bank and "creates an imbalance in the governance structure" of PLS. "Shareholders like to have consistent and complementary control system, which is missing in the case of mudaraba financing."

One hurdle the industry have failed to overcome is customer acceptance of periodic losses (the L in PLS) from investment. The characteristic of mudarabah to share banking losses with bank customer/investors has been advanced as a reason why Islamic financial institutions would be more stable than conventional banks. (In its 2015 paper "Islamic Finance: Opportunities, Challenges, and Policy Options", the International Monetary Fund lists ensuring "that profit-sharing investment accounts (PSIA) at Islamic banks [i.e. mudarabah accounts] are treated in a manner that is consistent with financial stability" as "an important regulatory challenge".) Proponents such as Taqi Usmani have preached that "normal trade activities of course result ... in losses from time to time", so the expectation by depositors of steady returns and no risk of loss is an unnatural product of capitalist banking, brought about by its separating finance "from normal trade activities". (Note: according to Taqi Usmani. "Once people understand this they will invest in Islamic finance.") In several decades of Islamic banking there have been bad debts—even major financial difficulties such as a major embezzlement scandal at Dubai Islamic Bank in 1998.

Yet, as of at least 2004, no bad debt has translated into losses for depositors in an Islamic bank, and "no Islamic bank has ever written-down the value of its depositor's accounts when it has written-down the value of its non-performing assets" for fear of losing depositors.

Aside from disadvantages to lenders, one critic of Islamic banking, Feisal Khan, argues that widespread use of PLS could have severe harm to economies. He notes that if banks took "a direct equity state in every enterprise" as called for in mudaraba and musharaka, credit would contract and central banks would be unable to use the usual ways of expand credit—buying bonds, commercial paper, etc.—to prevent liquidity crisises that arise from time to time in modern economies. While purists such as Usmani are correct that murabaha and other fixed income instruments (that have crowded out PLS) are essentially conventional banking by another name, if they were banned and replaced by the more "authentic" profit and loss sharing, central banks might be helpless to prevent contraction of economies and extreme joblessness.

=== Murabaha and ignoring required commodities ===
In addition to ignoring profit and loss sharing in favor of murâbaḥah, the industry has been accused of not properly following shariah regulations of murabahah (mentioned above), by not buying and selling the commodities/inventory that are "a key condition" of shariah-compliance (done when the bank wants to borrow cash rather than to finance a purchase, and though they are an added cost and serve no other function). In 2008 Arabianbusiness.com complained that there are sometimes "no commodities at all, merely cash-flows between banks, brokers and borrowers". Often the commodity is completely irrelevant to the borrower's business and not even enough of the relevant commodities "in existence" in the world "to account for all the transactions taking place". Two other researchers report that for many years multibillion-dollar 'synthetic' murabaha transactions in London took place, where "many doubt the banks truly assume possession, even constructively, of inventory".

=== Fund mingling ===
The original Islamic banking proponents called for "keeping distinct accounts for various types of deposits so that return can be assigned to each type". "In practice", according to critic Muhammad Akram Khan, "Islamic financial institutions pool all types of deposits".

=== Falsification ===
Critics complain that the compliance with sharia regulations by banks often is nothing more than the taking of the word of the bank or borrower that they have followed compliance rules, with no effective auditing to see if this is true. One observer (L. Al Nasser) complains that "Shariah authorities demonstrate excessive confidence in their subjects when it comes to dealing with parities in the industry", and Shariah audits are needed "to bring about transparency and ensure" that the institutions "deliver what they have committed to their customers". Furthermore, when external Shariah audits are carried out, "many of these auditors frequently complain about the amount of violations that they witness and cannot discuss" because the records they have examined "have been tampered with".

=== Following conventional (haram) returns ===
Although Islamic banking forbids interest, its "profit rates" often are benchmarked to interest rates. Islamic banker Harris Irfan states "there is no question" that benchmarks such as LIBOR "continue to be a necessary metric" for Islamic banks, and that the "overwhelming majority of scholars have come to accept this, however imperfect a solution this may seem", but Muhammad Akram Khan writes that following the conventional banking benchmark LIBOR "defeats the very purpose for which the Islamic financial products were designed and offered" in the first place.

In addition skeptics have complained that the rates of return on accounts in Islamic banks are suspiciously close to those of conventional banks, when (in theory) their different mechanisms should lead to different numbers. A 2014 study (using "the most recent econometric techniques") of the long-term relationship between term-deposit rates at conventional banks and "participation banks" (i.e. Islamic Banks) in Turkey found three of four participation banks term-deposit rates "significantly cointegrated" with those of the conventional banks, and that the "causality" of the Islamic banks rate of return following the conventional banks was "permanent". Skeptics suggest that this nearness suggests a manipulation of returns by Islamic banks, which are often smaller and less well-established, and feel the need to reassure customers of their financial competitiveness and stability.

=== Liquidity ===
Islamic banking and finance has lacked a way to earn a return on funds "parked" for the short term, waiting to be invested, which puts those banks a disadvantage to conventional banks.

Banks/financial institutions must balance liquidity—the ability to convert assets into cash or a cash equivalent quickly in an emergency when their depositors need them without incurring large losses—with a competitive rate of return on funds. Conventional banks are able to borrow and lend by using the interbank lending market—borrowing to meet liquidity requirements and investing for any duration including very short periods, and thereby optimize their earnings. Calculating the return for any period of time is straightforward—multiplying the loans length by the interest rate.

However, the religiously preferred mode of Islamic finance—profit and loss sharing (PLS)—must wait for the project invested in to come to fruition before profits can be distributed. Since profit or loss cannot be determined for short periods, no return is given on funds deposited for short periods. Islamic financial institutions cannot borrow or lend for short periods to/from the conventional interbank lending market.

The absence of any, or at least sufficient, Islamic Money Market instruments to invest in meant Islamic Banks held, on average, "40% more liquidity" (i.e. non-return paying funds) than their conventional counterparts, as of 2002. The Islamic Financial Services Board found that the "average daily volume of interbank transactions among Islamic financial institutions, between Islamic financial institutions and conventional banks, and between Islamic financial institutions and central banks is very low compared to trades in the conventional money market." While Muslim countries such as Bahrain, Iran, Malaysia and Sudan have started to develop an Islamic money market, and have been "issuing securitized papers on the basis of musharaka, mudaraba and ijara", at least as of 2013, the "lack of an appropriate and efficient secondary market" has meant the relative volume of these securities is "much smaller" than on the conventional capital market.

Regarding non-PLS, "debt-based contracts", one study found that "the business model of Islamic banking is changing over the time and moving in a direction where it is acquiring more liquidity risk."

To deal with the problem of earning no return on funds held for the sake of liquidity or because of a lack of investment opportunity, many Islamic financial institutions (such as Islamic Development Bank and the Faisal Islamic Bank of Egypt) have "been explicitly and openly earning interest on their excess funds, often invested in safer, debt-like or debt instruments overseas". Rather than forbidding this, "Shariah-experts have provided the necessary fatwa of Shari'ah-compliance based on the rules of necessities (darurah)". Researchers Frank Vogel and Frank Hayes write,

Scholars in Islamic finance and banking have invoked necessity to permit exceptional relaxations of rules. They have issued fatwas (opinions) allowing Islamic banks to deposit funds in interest-bearing accounts, particularly in foreign countries, because these banks have no alternative investments at the necessary maturities. Typically, however, they place conditions on such fatwas, such as requiring that the unlawful gains be used for religiously meritorious purposes such as charity, training, or research. Such fatwas are particular to the circumstances in which they are issued.

=== Social responsibility and emphasis ===
Following Islamic principles, "Islamic banks were supposed to adopt new financing policies and to explore new channels of investments" to encourage development and raise the standard of living of "small scale traders", but "very few Islamic banks and financial institutions have paid attention to this aspect", Taqi Usmani complains. Islamic scholar Mohammad Hashim Kamali, laments the focus on short-term financing by Islamic banks which is "largely concerned with the financing of goods already produced, and not with the creation or increase of production capital or with facilities like factories and plants, infrastructure etc."

Muhammad Akram Khan also complains that in its evolution towards convergence with conventional banking, Islamic banking's product development" has imitated conventional banks "rather than establishing "a different type of banking which was aligned to fairness, equitable income distribution, and ethical modes of investment."

Another scholar, (Mahmoud El-Gamal) also regrets that Islamic banking has focused on form rather than substance, and proposes "reorienting the brand name of Islamic finance to emphasize issues of community banking, microfinance, socially responsible investment and the like."

Other non-orthodox economists have been even more critical.

Challenging the basic premise of Islamic banking, Muhammad O. Farooq argues that the "preoccupation" of Islamic banking with the abolition of any and all interest comes at the expense of the "bigger picture" of pursuing economic justice in general, citing the Quranic injunction against concentration of wealth:

"What God has bestowed on his Messenger (and taken away) from the people of the townships—belongs to God—to his Messenger and to kindred and orphans, the needy and the wayfarer; in order that it may not (merely) make a circuit between the wealthy among you. ..."

He wonders if "greed and profit" are not far bigger causes of exploitation than interest on loans, which he argues may not constitute riba in a competitive, regulated market.

Comfortable with political tyranny, patronized by the few wealthy rentier classes in the Muslim world, and increasingly managed by the global financial powerhouses, the Islamic Banking and Finance movement is more than vulnerable to be confined in the realm of rhetoric against exploitation, or worse, inadvertently may even become an instrument of exploitation.The world in reality is full of exploitation: child exploitation, sexual exploitation, labor exploitation, etc. Interest is probably, if any, a small component in accounting for global exploitation. Yet, the proponents of Islamic economics and finance are fixated with interest.

He cites as an example the profit motive of the East India Company that colonized and ruled India at the expense of the Muslim Mughal Empire until 1858 and whose shares were equity not debt instruments. He finds it curious that while polemical works promoting Islamic banking and finance commonly assert that interest on loans exploits the poor and Muslims, there are few if any empirical or focused studies on the subject of exploitation or injustice in Islamic economics. (For example, Farooq complains there is "not a single citation for exploitation or injustice" in two substantial bibliographies on (orthodox) Islamic economics—Muslim Economic Thinking: A Survey of Contemporary Literature, with "700 entries under 51 subcategories over 115 pages", and Islamic Economics: Annotated Sources in English and Urdu by Muhammad Akram Khan.) (Note: There appear to be two different Muhammad Akram Khan from Pakistan writing on the subject of Islamic Economics. One orthodox in his approach: Muhammad Akram Khan qualified from the University of Punjab, Lahore (1967) and M. Sc. in Industrial Administration from the University of Aston, Birmingham, UK (1970); One non-orthodox: Muhammad Akram Khan, Former Deputy Auditor General of Pakistan (until 2003) and Chief Resident Auditor, UN Peacekeeping Missions (2003–2007))

Timur Kuran complains that while Islamic banks in Egypt and other Muslims countries have followed Western banking practices, and have been little help in economic development or job creation, they have not followed the practices of western venture capitalists, which "have financed the global high-tech industry". Since venture capital operates on the same principles as profit and loss sharing (although VC does not avoid haram products), its use could potentially "bring major benefits" to Egypt and other poor Muslims countries seeking economic development.

=== Lack of shariah uniformity ===
Most Islamic banks have their own Shariah boards ruling on their bank's policies. According to researchers Frank Vogel and Frank Hayes, the four schools (Madhhab) of Sunni fiqh (Islamic jurisprudence) have not come closer to agreement in Islamic banking. They apply "Islamic teachings to business and finance in different ways. Disagreements on specific points of religious law occur both between those four schools and within them. Furthermore, shari'a boards sometimes change their minds, reversing earlier decisions."

Along with the question raised by Ibrahim Warde of whether boards are "rubber stamping" sharia compliance of the banks that pays their salaries, differences between boards as to what constitutes shariah compliance may eventually present difficulties by "raising doubts in the minds of clients" over whether a given bank is truly shariah compliant, according to Munawar Iqbal and Philip Molyneux. "If Islamic banking is not perceived to be 'Islamic', it will not be long before the existing Islamic banks lose much of their market."

== Other challenges and issues ==
=== Late payments/Defaults ===
While in conventional finance late payments/delinquent loans are discouraged by interest continuing to accumulate, in Islamic finance control and management of late accounts has become a "vexing problems", according to Muhammad Akran Khan. Although a number of suggestions have been made to deal with the problem of delinquent loans in Islamic banking (Note: At least in theory late fees may be Islamically justified if they are donated to charity. The Egyptian Study on the Establishment of the Islamic Banking System suggests that `the problem of bad debts be solved by a ”cooperative insurance” to which borrowers contribute’.) according to Ibrahim Warde,

Islamic banks face a serious problem with late payments, not to speak of outright defaults, since some people take advantage of every dilatory legal and religious device ... In most Islamic countries, various forms of penalties and late fees have been established, only to be outlawed or considered unenforceable. Late fees in particular have been assimilated to riba. As a result, "debtors know that they can pay Islamic banks last since doing so involves no cost"

Warde also complains that

"Many businessmen who had borrowed large amounts of money over long periods of time seized the opportunity of Islamicization to do away with accumulated interest of their debt, by repaying only the principal—usually a puny sum when years of double-digit inflation were taken into consideration.

==== Inflation ====
Inflation is also a problem for financing where Islamic banks have not imitated conventional banking and are truly lending without interest or any other charges. Whether and how to compensate lenders for the erosion of the value of the funds from inflation, has also been called a problem "vexing" Islamic scholars, since finance for businesses will not be forthcoming if a lender loses money by lending. Suggestions include indexing loans (opposed by many scholars as a type of riba and encouraging inflation), denominating loans "in terms of a commodity" such as gold, and further research to find an answer.

=== Non-Muslim influence ===
Islamic banking and finance customers are almost all—if not entirely—Muslims. But the majority of financial institutions offering Islamic banking services are Western and owned by non-Muslims. Supporters of Islamic banking have cited this interest of western banks in Islamic banking as evidence of the strong and growing demand for Islamic banking and thus an "achievement of the movement". (Note: "Another achievement of Islamic banking may be gauged from the fact that many conventional banks have also started using Islamic banking techniques in the conduct of their business, particularly in dealing either with Muslim clients or in dominantly Muslim regions.")

However, critics complain these banks lack a deep faith-based commitment to Islamic banking which means

1. that Muslims employed within these organizations have little input into the actual management, resulting in sometimes well-founded suspicion among the Muslim populace as to the diligence of sharia compliance at these institutions. One conventional Malaysian Bank offering Islamic based investment funds was found to have the majority of these funds invested in the gaming industry; the managers administering these funds were non-Muslim.
2. that rather than a reflection of the growing strength of Islamic banking, the interest of conventional banks reflects how similar Islamic banking has become to the conventional sort, so that the later can enter Islamic banking without making substantive changes to its practices. El-Gamal wonders if the interest of large non-Muslim banks in Islamic finance is not a result of the profit-driven nature of Islamic finance in practice.
3. and that these banks will be more likely to withdrawing from the industry when the market takes a downturn. Harris Irfan argues that the lack of ideological commitment to Islamic banking by non-Muslim banks such as Deutsche Bank, has and will lead to their withdrawing from the industry when the market takes a downturn. In early 2011, during the housing bubble collapse, "not a single dedicated Islamic structurer or salesperson remained at Deutsche. Islamic finance had become 'a luxury the bank can't afford'". Perhaps in part because of this, in February 2011 Qatar Central Bank ordered conventional lenders "to close down their Islamic operations in the country by the end of the year." The Central Bank insisted it was too much for conventional banks to follow alternative capital adequacy rules for Islamic finance and too "difficult to supervise and monitor both Islamic and conventional operations of commercial banks since depositor fund would get mixed up."

=== Stability/Risk ===
Sources differ over whether Islamic banking is more stable and less risky than conventional banking.

Proponents (such as Zeti Akhtar Aziz, the head of the central bank of Malaysia) have argued that Islamic financial institutions are more stable than conventional banks because they forbid speculation and the two main types (in theory) of Islamic banking accounts—"current account" and mudarabah accounts—carry less risk to the bank (as mentioned above).

1. In a current account the customer earns no return, and (in theory) there is no risk of loss because the bank does not invest the account funds.
2. In a mudarabah account the Islamic bank carries less risk of loan defaults because it shares that risk with the depositor. If the borrower cannot pay back part or all of the money lent to them by the bank, the amount going to the depositor is cut by an equivalent amount, whereas in a conventional bank the depositor is given fixed interest payments whether or not the bank's earnings decline from loan defaults.

Critics complain that this stability comes at the expense of the stability of the balances of depositors/"partners" (Islamic banks often use the term "partner" instead of "customer" or "depositor") of the profit and loss sharing accounts, and these partners are exposed to risks they would not be subject to in conventional banks. In addition, according to one critic (Mahmoud A. El-Gamal),

In these institutions, investment-account holders neither have the protection of being creditors of the Islamic financial institution, nor do they have the protection of being equity holders with representation on those institutions' boards of directors. This introduces a host of other well-documented risk factors for the institution ...

On the other hand, Habib Ahmed writing in 2009 shortly after the 2008 financial crisis, argues that the practices of Islamic finance have gradually moved closer to conventional finance exposing them to the same dangers of instability.

When the practice of Islamic finance and the environment under which it operates are examined, one can identify trends that are similar to the ones that caused the current crisis.... In the recent past, the Gulf region has witnesses its own episodes of speculation in their stock and real estate markets. Finally, the Islamic financial industry has witnessed rapid growth with innovations of complex Shari'ah compliant financial products. Risks in these new Islamic financial products are complex, as the instruments have multiple types of risks ...

In any event, a few Islamic banks have failed over the decades. In 1988 the Islamic investment house, Ar-Ryan collapsed causing thousands of small investors to lose their savings (they were later reimbursed for their losses by an anonymous Gulf state donor) and dealing a blow to Islamic finance at the time. In 1998 the management of Bank al Taqwa's failed. with its annual report reporting a "loss of over 23 per cent of principal to both mudaraba depositors and shareholders". (It was later revealed that management had violated banking rules "invested in one single project more than 60 per cent bank's assets.")

The Ihlas Finance House in Turkey closed in 2001 due to "liquidity problems and financial distress". Faisal Islamic Bank had difficulties and closed its operations in the UK for regulatory reasons. According to the Economist magazine, "Dubai's debt crisis in 2009 showed that sukuk [Islamic bonds] can help to inflate debt to unsustainable levels."

Recessions

During the 2008 financial crisis, Islamic banks "on average, showed stronger resilience" than conventional banks, but "faced larger losses" when the crisis hit "the real economy", according to a 2010 IMF survey.

At the beginning of the "Great Recession" of 2007-9, Islamic banks were "unscathed", leading to one Islamic banking supporter to write that the collapse of leading Wall Street institutions, particularly Lehman Brothers, "should encourage economists world-wide to focus on Islamic banking and finance as an alternative model." However gradually the effect of the financial downturn moved to the real sector, affecting Islamic banking. According to Ibrahim Warde, "this showed that Islamic finance was not all a panaceas, and that a faith-based system is not automatically immune to the vagaries of the Financial system."

Concentrated ownership

Concentration of ownership is another danger to the stability of Islamic banking and finance, according to Munawar Iqbal and Philip Molyneux. They write that only:

"three or four families own a large percentage of the industry. ... This concentration of ownership could result in substantial financial instability and possible collapse of the industry if anything happens to those families, or the next generation of these families change their priorities. Similarly, the experience of country-wide experiments has also been mostly on the initiatives of rulers not elected through popular votes."

Macroeconomic exposures

"Macroeconomic exposures" of Islamic banks constitute a "ticking time bomb" of a "billions of dollars" in "unhedged currencies and rates", Harris Irafan warns. The difficulty, complexity, and expense of hedging these in the correct Islamic manner is such that as of 2015, the Islamic Development Bank "was hemorrhaging cash as if it were funding a war. It simply couldn't swap dollars for euros or vice versa on an ongoing basis without resorting to the conventional markets." Regional Islamic banks in the Middle East and Malaysia did not have "specialized personnel trained to understand and negotiate Sharia-compliant treasury swaps" and were not willing to hire the consultants who did.

=== Costs ===
Muhammad El-Gamal argues that because Islamic financial products imitate conventional financial products but operate in accordance with the rules of shariah, different products will require additional jurist and lawyer fees, "multiple sales, special-purpose vehicles, and documentations of title". In addition there will be costs associated with "the peculiar structure that Islamic banks use for late payment penalties". Consequently, their financing tends to cost more than, and the return on accounts tends to pay less than that of conventional products.

El-Gama also argues that another source of inefficiency/greater expense in Islamic banking and a reason its replications of conventional finance are "always one step behind" new financial products in the conventional industry, is the industry's dependence on "classical "nominate contracts" (murabahah credit sales, ijara leases, etc.). These contracts follow classical texts and were created in a time when financial markets were very limited. They are not equipped to "disentangle various risks" that "modern" financial markets and institutions (such as "money markets, capital markets, options markets, etc.") are designed to. On the other hand, making their contracts/products more efficient, will alienate the pious customer base that believes that contracts/products should follow classical forms.

In one important part of the finance market—home buying—Islamic finance has not been able to compete with conventional finance in at least some countries (UK, Canada, US2), as of 2002 (UK) and 2009 (North America). According to Humayon Dar, the monthly payments, for a shariah compliant "Lease Contract" used by Islamic Investment Banking Unit of Ahli United Bank Kuwait in Britain "are much higher" than equivalent conventional mortgages. In Canada the cost of Islamic home finance was 100 to 300 basis points higher than conventional home finance, and in the US 40 to 100 basis points higher, according to Hans Visser. (Visser credits the higher cost of Islamic ijara financing to its higher risk weighting compared to conventional mortgages under Basel I and Basel II international standard of minimum capital requirements for banks.) (In some cases Islamic "profit" rates are the same as conventional mortgage rates but "closing costs will run a few hundred dollars extra.")

According to reports (from 2005 and 2006) by M. Kabir Hassan, efficiency of Murabaha-dominated Islamic banks is not high. "The average cost efficiency" of the banks studied was 74%, whereas "the average profit efficiency" was 84%. "Although Islamic banks are less efficient in containing cost, they are generally efficient in generating profit." A later report on efficiency measures "such as cost, allocative, technical, pure technical and scale", stated that "on average, the Islamic banking industry is relatively less efficient compared to their conventional counterparts in other parts of the world."

Other studies have found Islamic banks somewhat less efficient, on average, than their conventional counterparts in non-Muslim majority parts of the world (measured by comparing banks' revenues with its expenses minus profit paid to depositors),

- a study of banks in Malaysia from 1997 to 2003 and of
- and Islamic banks in Turkey from 1999 to 2001;
- In contrast one multi-country study, covering a similar time period (1999–2005) as the studies above, found no "significant differences" in overall efficiency (A study published in 2008 measuring "the cost, revenue and profit efficiency" of 43 Islamic and 37 conventional banks in 21 countries from 1999 to 2005). (Note: Another study found better profitability among Islamic banks than conventional in one year (2008, credited to their business model), and worse another (2009, because of "weaker risk management." From a study of 120 Islamic banks -- 80% of all Islamic financial institutions worldwide -- in eight countries).)

=== Maturity ===
"Common explanations offered by" the Islamic finance movement for the Islamic banking industry shortcomings (as mentioned above and according to M.O.Farooq) are that:

1. industry problems and challenges are part of a "learning curve" and will be solved over time;
2. unless and until the industry operates in an Islamic society and environment it will be hindered by non-Islamic influences and won't "operate in its essence".

While the veracity of the second explanation can not be verified before a complete Islamic society is established, Feisal Khan points out in regard to the first defense that since this it was made in 1993, the industry has not shown much evidence of "learning". In that year critic Timur Kuran highlighted the industry problems (the basic similarity of Islamic banking in practice to the conventional, the marginalizing of the equity-based, risk-sharing modes and embrace of short-term products and debt-like instruments), and a supporter (Ausaf Ahmad) defended the industry as early in its transition from conventional banking.

Seventeen years later, Ibrahim Warde, an Islamic finance proponent, lamented that "rather than disappearing, murabaha and comparable sale-based products grew significantly and today they constitute the bulk of the activity of most Islamic Banks..."

Most critics of the Islamic banking industry call for further orthodoxy and a redoubling of effort and stricter enforcement of sharia. (Note: such as Muhammad Taqi Usmani, Saleh Abdullah Kamel and Harris Irfan) Some (M.O.Farooq and M.A.Khan), have blamed the industry problems on its condemnation of any and all interest on loans as forbidden riba, and the impracticality of attempting to enforce this prohibition.

== See also ==
- Islamic banking and finance
- Profit and loss sharing
- Islamic economics
- Islamic finance products, services and contracts
- Riba
- Muamalat
- List of Islamic terms in Arabic
