= Lori Richards =

American lawyer

Lori A. Richards
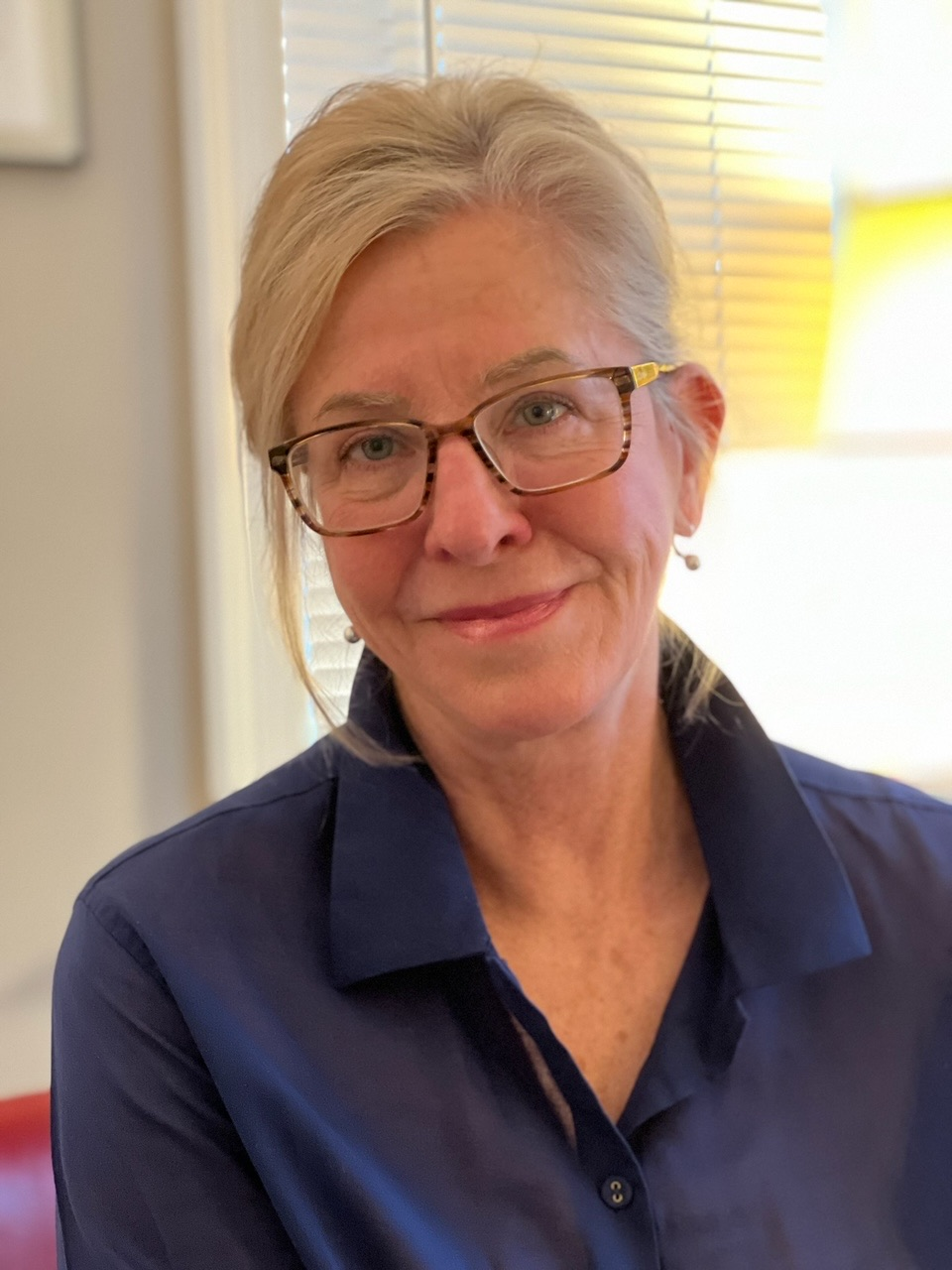
- Born: 1960 (age 65–66)
- Education: Northern Illinois University (B.A.); American University Washington College of Law (J.D.)
- Occupation: Lawyer
- Years active: 1985–present
- Known for: Inaugural director of the Office of Compliance Inspections and Examinations (OCIE) at the Securities and Exchange Commission
- Spouse: Ken Newbaker
- Awards: 1992: Irving Pollack Award; 1997: Presidential Rank Award for Meritorious Service; 2001: Presidential Rank Award for Distinguished Service; 2008: SEC's Distinguished Service Award

Lori A. Richards (born 1960) is an American lawyer who served as the inaugural director of the Office of Compliance Inspections and Examinations (OCIE) at the Securities and Exchange Commission (SEC) from 1995 to 2009.

== Early life and education ==
Richards was born in 1960. She earned a B.A. in political science from Northern Illinois University in 1982. Later, she attended the American University Washington College of Law, where she graduated with a J.D. in 1985.

== Career ==
Lori Richards began her career with the Securities and Exchange Commission (SEC) in 1985 in the Enforcement program in Los Angeles. From July 1992 to May 1994, she served as Associate Director for Enforcement of the SEC's Pacific Regional Office, overseeing the agency's enforcement program in that region. Concurrently, from February 1993 to May 1994, she was the Acting District Administrator of the SEC's San Francisco District Office. From May 1994 to May 1995, Richards was the Executive Assistant and Senior Adviser to SEC Chairman Arthur Levitt.

In May 1995, Richards was appointed by SEC Chairman Arthur Levitt as the first Director of the Office of Compliance Inspections and Examinations (OCIE). As Director of the OCIE, Richards implemented a risk assessment program to strengthen the surveillance of SEC-registered firms. She initiated the CCOutreach program, issued ComplianceAlerts, and published reports to enhance industry compliance. Richards also upgraded training for SEC examiners and integrated advanced technology into regulatory oversight. During her tenure, she helped identify and address various compliance issues, including abusive trading practices, deficiencies in credit rating agencies, conflicts of interest, asset valuation errors, insider trading, sales of securities to seniors at "free lunch" seminars, soft dollar arrangements, undisclosed business dealings, and mutual funds' payments for shelf space.

After leaving the SEC in 2009, Richards became a Principal at PricewaterhouseCoopers (PwC) and later served as the chief compliance officer for JPMorgan Asset and Wealth Management.

In April 2022, Richards became a board member of Wahed.

== Personal life ==
Lori Richards is married to Ken Newbaker. In 2020, the couple established a scholarship, Lori Richards and Ken Newbaker Undergraduate Scholarship, at Northern Illinois University with a $500,000 estate gift to assist students struggling to finance their education.

== Awards and recognition ==
- 1992: Irving Pollack Award
- 1997: Presidential Rank Award for Meritorious Service
- 2001: Presidential Rank Award for Distinguished Service
- 2008: SEC's Distinguished Service Award
