= Meatheads Burgers & Fries =

American restaurant chain

Meatheads Burgers & Fries, LLC
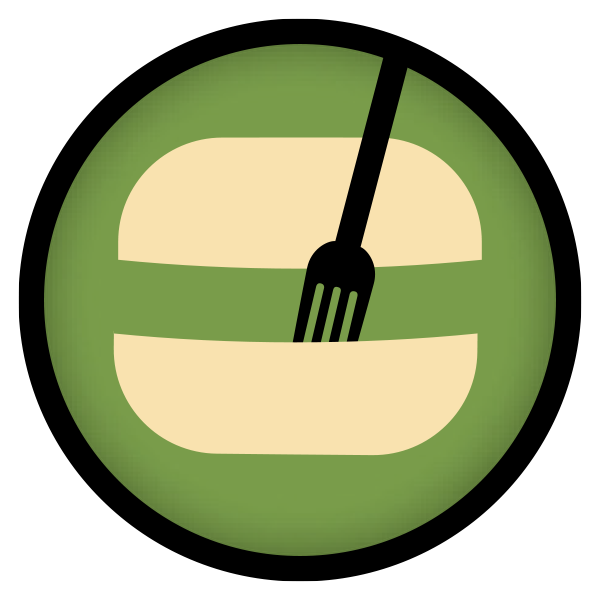
- Type: Fast casual restaurant
- Industry: Fast casual
- Founded: 2007; 19 years ago in Bloomington, Illinois
- Founder: Tom Jednorowicz; Doug Reichl
- Defunct: 2024
- Successor: Epic Burger
- Headquarters: Chicago, Illinois, United States
- Parent: Epic Burger
- Website: www.meatheadsburgers.com

Meatheads Burgers & Fries (commonly referred to as Meatheads) was an American fast-casual retailer of high-end hamburgers and other related menu items based in Illinois.

The company was founded by Tom Jednorowicz, formerly an executive at Potbelly Sandwich Works and Einstein Bros. Bagels, and Doug Reichl, founder of Tartan Realty Group. Meatheads started in Bloomington, Illinois in 2007 and became a popular spot among students of Illinois State University and the popular young crowd. The company went on to open fourteen more locations in the Chicago area, first entering that market in 2009. As of October 2016, 17 locations were in operation, one of which was in Champaign, Illinois near the University of Illinois at Urbana–Champaign campus.

Among a growing number of specialty burger chains in the United States, Meatheads attempted to differentiate from its competition such as Five Guys and Smashburger by cutting a customer's fries in front of them, similar to west-coast based In-N-Out Burger. Meatheads described itself as a "fast-casual" chain as opposed to a traditional fast-food chain.

With reported annual sales in 2011 of approximately $5 million, the chain was solely composed of company-owned stores, and never implemented a franchise model. In 2019, the partners sold the company to Crave Brands, LLC.

On April 9, 2021, Meatheads Burgers & Fries filed for Chapter 11 bankruptcy protection. The chain's parent company, Crave Brands LLC, filed for Chapter 11 bankruptcy protection the same day. In September 2023, Epic Burger acquired the remaining six Meatheads locations and began the process of converting them to Epic Burger, starting with the Northbrook location. As of July 2024, only two locations remained; they were also later replaced.
