= Faith Based Initiative =

Faith Based Initiative may refer to:

- Faith Based Initiative (The West Wing), an episode of the television series, The West Wing (season 6)
- Faith-based organization
- White House Office of Faith-Based and Neighborhood Partnerships, formerly the White House Office of Faith-Based and Community Initiatives

== See also ==
- Faith-based (disambiguation)
