= Bai Salam =

Type of Islamic contract

Bai Salam (Arabic بيع سلم, more accurately transliterated as Bai us Salami) is an Islamic contract in which full payment is made in advance for specific goods (often agricultural products) to be delivered at a future date. It is necessary that the quality of the commodity intended to be purchased is fully specified leaving no ambiguity leading to dispute. Bai salam covers almost every thing which is capable of being definitely described as to quality, quantity and workmanship. For Islamic banks this product is an ideal for Agriculture financing but can also be used to finance the working capital needs to the business customer. It is one of the most popular Islamic Modes of finance used by banks in Islamic countries to promote riba-free transactions.

Early and contemporary jurists agree on the legitimacy of Salam. In general under Shariah law, no sale is lawful unless the goods being sold are in existence at the time of the agreement. Salam sale is an exception found in the hadith of the prophet of Islam Muhammad (collections of his sayings and teachings) provided the goods are defined and the date of delivery is fixed. Upon migration from Makkah, Mohammed came to Madinah, where the people used to pay in advance the price of fruit or dates to be delivered over one, two or three years. However, such sale was carried out without specifying the quality, measure or weight of the commodity or the time of delivery. Mohammed ordained: “Whoever pays money in advance for fruit to be delivered later should pay it for a known quality, specified measure and weight (of dates or fruit) of course along with the price and time of delivery”.

== Principles ==
The Salam transaction is subject to the strict conditions as follows:

1. It is necessary for the validity of Salam that the buyer pays the price in full to the seller at the time of affecting the sale. In the absence of full payment, it will be tantamount to sale of a debt against a debt, which is expressly prohibited by Mohammed. Moreover, the basic rationale for allowing Salam is to facilitate the "instant need" of the seller. If it is not paid in full, the basic purpose will not be achieved.
2. Only those goods can be sold through a Salam contract in which the quantity and quality can be exactly specified e.g. precious stones cannot be sold on the basis of Salam because each stone differ in quality, size, weight and their exact specification is not possible.
3. Salam cannot be affected on a particular commodity or on a product of a particular field or farm e.g. Supply of wheat of a particular field or the fruit of a particular tree 24 The hadith reported by Imam Bukhari, Muslim and others.
4. All details in respect to quality of goods sold must be expressly specified leaving no ambiguity, which may lead to a dispute.
5. It is necessary that the quantity of the commodity is agreed upon in absolute terms. It should be measured or weighed in its usual measure only, meaning what is normally weighed cannot be quantified and vice versa.
6. The exact date and place of delivery must be specified in the contract.
7. Salam cannot be affected in respect of things, which must be delivered at spot.

== See also ==
- Islamic banking
- FINCA Afghanistan, a murabaha-compliant microfinance institution (MFI)
- Shariah investments
