= Sharia Board =

Islamic financial compliance group

A Sharia Board (also Sharia Supervisory Board, Advisory Board or Religious Board) certifies Islamic financial products as being Sharia-compliant (i.e. in accordance with Islamic law). Because compliance with Sharia law is the underlying reason for the existence of Islamic finance, Islamic banks (and conventional banking institutions that offer Islamic banking products and services) should establish a Sharia Supervisory Board (SSB) to advise them on whether their products comply, and to ensure that their operations and activities comply with Sharia principles. There are also national Sharia boards in many Muslim majority countries that regulate Islamic financial institutions nationwide.

== History ==
Some of the first Islamic financial institutions to have a Sharia Boards were the Faisal Islamic Bank of Egypt, (founded in 1976); the Jordan Islamic Bank, (founded in 1978); the Sudanese Faisal Islamic Bank (founded in 1978); the Kuwaiti House of Finance (founded in 1979).

== Requirements ==
According to Juan Solé, "the first measure" that an institution wishing to offer Islamic products "must undertake, is to appoint a Sharia board or, at a very minimum, a Sharia counselor". According to Nizam Yaquby, one of the most important "required conditions" for a conventional bank entering Islamic banking is "the existence of a Sharia supervisory board".

Sharia Boards have "both supervisory and consultative functions" — reviewing the operations of their financial institution to make sure they comply with the Sharia (sometimes called “Sharia auditing”), and answering questions (of their institution's staff) on whether or not some proposed transactions or products follows the Sharia and giving a fatwa (religious edict) on them.

According to the Accounting and Auditing Organization for Islamic Financial Institutions (AAOIFI):

`A Shariah Supervisory Board (SSB) is an independent body of specialized jurists in fiqh al-mu'amalat (Islamic commercial jurisprudence) ... The Shariah Supervisory Board is entrusted with the duty of directing, reviewing and supervising the activities of the Islamic financial institution ... The fatwas (legal opinions) and ruling of the Board shall be binding.`

This includes:

a. certifying financial instruments for their compliance with the Shariah;
b. verifying transactions for compliance with the Shariah;
c. calculating zakah payable by Islamic financial institutions;
d. disposing of non-shariah-compliant income;
e. advising on the distribution of income among investors and shareholders.

According to the Institute of Islamic Banking and Insurance, a Sharia board must have at least three members. Faleel Jamaldeen states that in practice most Sharia boards have three to six members, with one chair and one general secretariat. He notes that one Sharia board (at HSBC Amanah) had regional committees for Malaysia, Saudi Arabia, Indonesia, and Singapore to deal with the "spectrum of beliefs" across the Muslim world.

A number of Sharia advisory firms have now emerged to offer Sharia advisory services to the institutions offering Islamic financial services. The World Database for Islamic Banking and Finance (WDIBF)by Fayaz Ahmad Lone has been developed to provide information about all the websites related to this type of banking.

In addition to the individual Sharia boards that every Islamic financial institution has, there are organizations that have issued guidelines and standards for Sharia-compliance: Accounting and Auditing Organization for Islamic Financial Institutions, Fiqh Academy of the Organisation of Islamic Cooperation, Islamic Financial Services Board (IFSB) (2009). However, since Islamic financial institution have their own SSB, they are not obliged to follow these guidelines and standards. A number of Sharia advisory firms have emerged to offer Shariah advisory services to institutions offering Islamic financial services.

=== Different countries ===
Though sharing a common objective, Sharia boards in different jurisdictions around the Muslim world differ "in issues of methods of appointment, composition of members, and legal status of the ruling, internal supervision", among other things. The AAOIFI works to bring harmony to all this, according to researcher Mohammad Abdullah Nadwi. Since the advent of modern Islamic banking, the work of the Sharia boards has become more standardized.

According to Nadwi, writing in 2012, in "most" Muslim majority countries "some industry-oriented non-governmental bodies" set the requirements for SSBs. According to Ibrahim Warde, one such body is the International Association of Islamic Banks which requires that members of SSBs be "jurists and men of Islamic jurisprudence" with "conviction and firm belief" in Islamic banking, not be employees of the financial institution they supervise, and be appointed by and have their remuneration set by a "general assembly" rather than the institution's board of directors.

But governmental or quasi-governmental bodies play an important part in supervision. As of 2013, for example, the regulators in Bahrain, Indonesia, Jordan, Kuwait, Lebanon, Malaysia and Pakistan have developed guidelines for SSBs in their respective jurisdictions. Some countries, like Indonesia, Kuwait, Malaysia, Pakistan, Sudan, and the UAE have centralized SSBs

In Malaysia a Sharia Advisory Council, was established in 1997 to determine Islamic law regarding Islamic financial institutions, and in 2009 became the "sole authoritative body" for Sharia for that country's Islamic finance industry. It was set up at Bank Negara Malaysia (BNM). The individual Sharia boards that are in each Malaysian Islamic financial institution provide a second tier of supervision.

In Indonesia, all Islamic banks are "required" to have a Sharia supervisory board, according to Mabid Ali Al Jarhi. The National Sharia Board of Indonesia issues fatawa on all Islamic financial products created in Indonesia, the central bank (Bank Indonesia) uses the fatawa to regulate the Indonesian Islamic Financial industry, and the individual Sharia supervisory boards or Sharia boards ensure the National Sharia Board fatawa are followed. In April 2015 the national Sharia board approved "Sharia-compliant currency hedging tools and a standard contract template for Sharia-compliant repurchase agreements", for example. But "weak government management (a lack of ministerial-level coordination)" and "an uncertain legal environment" have hindered expansion of Islamic banking in Indonesia.

The central bank of Pakistan ("State Bank of Pakistan") has an "Islamic Banking Department" that as of 2016 describes itself as "enabling legal, regulatory and Shariah compliance framework" for that country's Islamic banking industry (along with other tasks such as promoting Islamic finance).

The Central Bank of Kuwait issued instructions on “Shariah Supervisory Governance for Kuwaiti Islamic Banks” in December 2016 as part of their "Shariah supervisory regulations for Islamic banks as per applicable best practices".

As of late 2014, Bahrain was planning to set up a central Sharia board for Islamic banks.

In non-Muslim majority UK, the government banking regulatory body, the Financial Services Authority, recognises the special position of the SSBs within Islamic banks, and will not regulate "the composition, competencies, or operation" of such boards or its personnel if the board is "purely advisory" and uninvolved with management of the institution. If the board does have a management roll, it will be subject to the FSA approval process, including "fulfilment of legal qualification and competency criteria".

== Challenges ==
Some Islamic Banking observers believe the industry suffers from handpicked, highly paid Sharia experts approving financial products that have resorted to ḥiyal (legal stratagem) to follow Sharia law, "shunning controversial issues", or "rubber stamping" bank management decisions after perfunctory reviews. and that the banking practices approved by this small number of Islamic jurists have moved closer and closer to the practices of conventional non-Islamic banking.

=== "Fatwa shopping" ===
Journalist John Foster notes that "top scholars" often earn "six-figure sums" for each fatwa on a financial product, and that this can lead to “Fatwa shopping” for the most favorable judgement. (While the AAOIFI and Institute of Islamic Banking and Insurance, among other groups and scholars, insist that each financial institution have its own Sharia Supervisory Board, at least some institutions depend on independent Sharia advisory services for the approval of at least some products.)

He quotes an "investment banker based in Dubai":

“We create the same type of products that we do for the conventional markets. We then phone up a Sharia scholar for a Fatwa ... If he doesn't give it to us, we phone up another scholar, offer him a sum of money for his services and ask him for a Fatwa. We do this until we get Sharia compliance. Then we are free to distribute the product as Islamic.”

According to Foster, this practice of shopping for an Islamic scholar who will issue a fatwa testifying that a banking product obeys Shari'ah law has led to financing mechanisms that appear to outsiders to be mortgages "dressed up in Arabic terminology"—such as Mudarabah, or Ijarah (lease agreements) -- being declared Sharia compliant.

Mahmoud El-Gamal believes that from the 1970s to the 2000s there has been an evolution of the industry towards "progressively closer approximations" of the practices of conventional banking, approved by "progressively smaller" numbers of jurists. For example, only a small group of jurists approving "unsecured lending" to retail and corporate customers through the tawarruq mode (where the commodity being financed is immediately sold to raise cash) in the early 2000s. On the other hand, Faleel Jamaldeen describes this change as a natural growing process, where profit and loss sharing was replaced by other contracts because "they were no longer sufficient to meet industry demands for project financing, home financing, liquidity management and other products".

=== Independence ===
Researchers have also questioned of the independence of and conflicts of interest with Sharia supervisory boards (SSBs) whose employment and compensation is determined by the same institutions (via its board of directors acting on behalf of the shareholders) whose bottom line the SSB's fatawa can make an enormous difference upon. At least one study has found that this arrangement "compromise(s) the independence of the SSB", while another found Islamic financial institutions do "not have practices which ensure transparency in the role and functions of the SSBs".

Scarcity

Another issue is the need for Sharia supervisors to be trained in both Islamic commercial law and contemporary financial practices, the scarcity of such people, and the high prices they command as a result. The most popular/highly regarded Sharia supervisors end up working for many institutions, including competitors—one study found the busiest Sharia scholar held 85 positions in Islamic financial institutions and 12 positions in standard-setting bodies, and the top 20 scholars holding 621 Sharia board positions,—creating potential conflicts of interest.

The scarcity also bids up fees. Two researchers noted the small group of Sharia experts "earn as much as US$88,500 per year per bank" and can "charge up to US$500,000 for advice on large capital market transactions."

This raises the question of whether what one writer calls "alliance of wealth and Shari'ah scholarship" has been created and led Sharia supervisors into what another writer calls "certain changes in viewpoint" resulting in "over-stretching the rules of Shariah".

This alliance also gives the Ulema (religious scholars) a new source of income that by far exceeds what they were used to earning. It gives them an opening to a new lifestyle that includes air travel, sometimes in private jets, staying in five-star hotels, being under the focus of media attention and providing their opinions to people of high social and economic ranks, who are anxious to listen. In addition, they are frequently commissioned to undertake paid-for fiqh (jurisprudence) research and to find solutions to problems that the new breed of bankers face.

== See also ==
- Islamic banking and finance
- Sharia investments
- Shariah Board entry in the Islamic Finance WIKI
