= Wahed (company) =

American financial technology and services company

Wahed Inc.
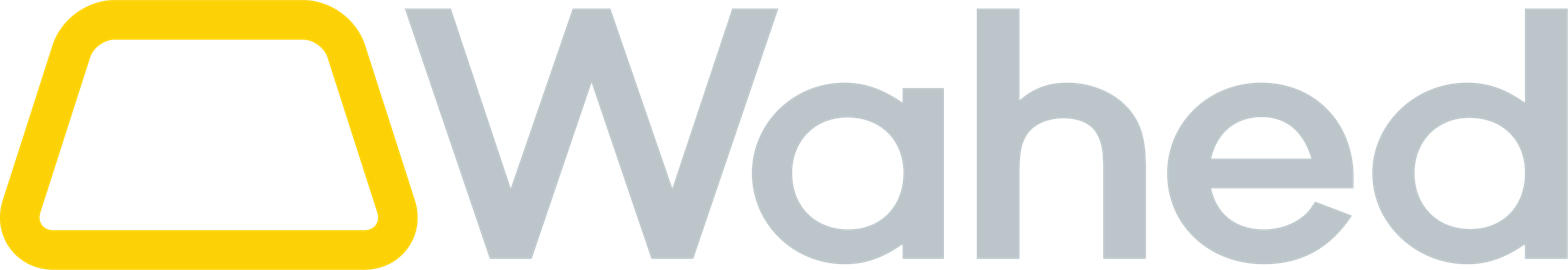
- Industry: Finance
- Founded: 2017
- Headquarters: New York
- Areas served: Worldwide
- Key people: Mohsin Siddiqui (CEO)
- Products: Asset management Mobile app Website
- AUM: $2 billion
- Number of employees: 100+
- Website: https://wahed.com/

Wahed is an American financial technology and services company based in New York City, New York. In July 2019, the company launched the first exchange-traded fund in the United States that was compliant with Sharia law. Wahed operates in 130 countries and has offices in Washington D.C, New York, London and Dubai. According to Bloomberg, it had a valuation of $300 million in 2022.

== History ==
In 2017, Wahed Invest launched the world's first automated Islamic investment platform.

In November 2017, Wahed raised seed capital from investors including former JPMorgan Chase managing director John Elkhair and director of McKinsey & Company, Laurent Nordin.

In August 2018, Wahed made its first international expansion by launching its operations in the UK. In October 2018, Wahed raised a $7 million round with Cue Ball Capital and BECO Capital. In November 2018, the company launched a Halal Stock Screener mobile app to compare 50,000 Sharia-compliant stocks.

In July 2019, the company launched the Wahed FTSE USA Shariah ETF (HLAL), which tracks a benchmark derived from the broad FTSE USA Index.

In July 2020, Wahed raised $25 million in a Series A funding round led by Saudi Aramco Entrepreneurship Ventures with participation from existing investors BECO and Cue Ball Capital, as well as Dubai Cultiv8 and Rasameel. In December 2020 Wahed acquired Niyah Ltd, a British company that runs a digital banking app designed for the Muslim community for an undisclosed amount.

In 2021, Khabib Nurmagomedov joined as an investor and brand ambassador, and in 2022, Paul Pogba also joined these roles. On 10 February 2022, the U.S. Securities and Exchange Commission charged Wahed Invest, LLC with making misleading statements and for compliance failures related to its Shari’ah advisory business. In June 2022, Wahed completed a $50 million Series B funding round, putting the company's valuation at $300 million.

In March 2024, Wahed's founder Junaid Wahedna stepped down as CEO and was succeeded by ComplyAdvantage's former Chief Revenue Officer Mohsin Siddiqui.

== Company ==
Wahed is aimed at investors looking for ethical investments aligned with Islamic principles. Wahed is regulated in the following jurisdictions: SEC (USA), FCA (UK), SEBI (India), OJK (Indonesia), AFSA (Kazakhstan), SC (Malaysia), FSC (Mauritius) and FSCA (South Africa). An ethical review board monitors the company's investments to make sure they agree with Islamic values. The investment company cannot involve liquor, firearms, gambling or tobacco industries, nor can they generate excess profit from charging interest. The robo-advisor invests in Sukuks (Islamic bonds), U.S. stocks, emerging stock markets, real estate and gold.
