= Dow Jones Islamic Fund =

The Iman Fund (symbol: IMANX) is an American faith based mutual fund that invests in Shariah compliant companies. The fund's 2000 inception catered to the needs of Muslim investors, who not only want to have a financially rewarding investment, but a Shariah compatible one as well.

== Structure and activities ==
The Iman Fund is offered by Allied Asset Advisers, a subsidiary of the North American Islamic Trust (NAIT). Allied Asset Advisers is the registered investment adviser and manager of the Fund. The Fund invests at least 80% of its net assets in domestic and foreign securities included in the Dow Jones Islamic Indexes, as well as up to 20% of its net assets in securities chosen by the Fund's Investment Adviser that meet Islamic principles. The fund consists solely of common stocks. It includes, among others, shares of stocks from the Dow Jones Islamic Market US Index, which tracks American companies that meet Islamic principles. The indexes are advised by a Shariah Supervisory Board of six prominent Islamic scholars from six countries. The investment adviser is advised by a board of trustees of prominent Islamic scholars from the United States.

== Characteristics of the Iman Fund ==
- Shariah Compliance - The fund adheres to the criteria developed by the Shariah Supervisory Board composed of internationally renowned scholars. Based on these criteria, the following businesses are generally excluded: alcohol, tobacco, pork products, conventional financial services (banking, insurance, etc.), weapons, defense, and entertainment. The Fund does not invest in interest-paying instruments (riba) frequently used by mutual funds as temporary investments, and instead may hold cash on a temporary basis.
- Diversification - The Fund offers diversification with a portfolio of over 300 Shariah Compliant companies in diverse business sectors.
- Low Expenses - The Fund is a no-load fund with one of the lowest annual fees of any Shariah compliant fund available.
- Accessibility and Flexibility - The Fund is available at Charles Schwab and TD Ameritrade, offering flexible accounts and services including telephone purchase and redemption, and check writing.
- Active Portfolio Management - An actively managed portfolio enables the Fund to take advantage of future opportunities in the market while adhering to Islamic legal requirements. Among the securities that meet Islamic principles, the investment adviser determines a security's attractiveness for purchase based on a number of factors, including its anticipated value and record of earnings growth, among other things.

== Stock Selection and Performance ==
The Fund invests in foreign securities which involve risks relating to adverse political, social and economic developments abroad, as well as currency risks and differences in accounting methods. In selection of stocks, the Fund adheres to the criteria developed by the Shariah Supervisory Board of the Dow Jones Islamic Index composed of internationally renowned scholars. The Fund also does not invest in interest-related instruments and may hold cash on a temporary basis. It is possible that such restrictions may result in lower overall Fund performance than those mutual funds which are not subject to such restrictions. One year returns before taxes for the period ending December 31, 2004 were 5.45 percent; returns after taxes on distribution were 5.43 percent.

== See also ==
- Dow Jones & Company
- Dow Jones Global Indexes
- Shariah investments
- Islamic banking and finance
