= Inspire Investing =

- Founded: 2015; 11 years ago
- Headquarters: Meridian, Idaho, United States
- Key people: Robert Netzly (CEO)
- Website: inspireinvesting.com

Inspire Investing is an investment company based in Meridian, Idaho. The company offers what they call "biblically responsible" investment advice, engages in evangelical shareholder activism, and operates several Exchange-traded funds. Inspire Investing was started by Robert Netzly in 2015, and was originally based in San Benito, California.

As of 2026, Inspire Investing manages more than $4 billion in assets. The company pledges to give 50% of its net profits to Christian ministries.

In September 2024, the United States Securities and Exchange Commission charged Inspire Investing with misleading investors regarding its investment strategy. Without admitting or denying the SEC’s findings, Inspire Investing agreed to a censure and cease-and-desist order, to pay a $300,000 penalty, and to retain an independent compliance consultant.
