= Cue Ball Capital =

American venture capital firm in Boston, Massachusetts

- Industry: Venture capital
- Founded: 2005
- Founder: Richard J. Harrington, Tony Tjan, John Hamel, Mats Lederhausen
- Headquarters: Boston, Massachusetts, United States
- Website: cueball.com

Cue Ball is a venture capital firm in Boston, Massachusetts. Cue Ball makes investments in venture and early stage companies in consumer and media businesses, focusing on lifestyle brands and services, restaurants and specialty retail, information data services, and social media and commerce. It was founded in 2005.

== History ==
Cue Ball Group was founded in 2005 by Anthony Tjan and John Hamel, who had previously worked together at the internet services firm ZEFER. They were joined by Richard Harrington, former CEO of Thomson Reuters, who became chairman and general partner, and Mats Lederhausen, a former McDonald's executive with experience in consumer brands.

MiniLuxe, a nail and beauty-care company co-founded by Tjan and Hamel, was Cue Ball's founding investment.
