= Accounting and Auditing Organization for Islamic Financial Institutions =

Bahraini non-profit organization

- Abbreviation: AAOIFI
- Formation: February 26, 1990; 36 years ago in Algeria.
- Founders: Islamic Development Bank, Dallah Al-Baraka, Faysal Group (Dar Al Maal Al Islami), Al Rajhi Banking & Investment Corporation, Kuwait Finance House and Al-Bukhary Foundation
- Type: Independent international not-for-profit organization
- Purpose: Standardization and harmonization of international Islamic finance practices and financial reporting in accordance to Sharia
- Headquarters: Manama, Bahrain
- Location: Yateem Center, Block: 304, Al-Muthana road
- Coordinates: 26°14′2″N 50°34′38″E
- Region served: Worldwide
- Official language: English, Arabic
- Main organ: General Assembly
- Website: www.aaoifi.com

Accounting and Auditing Organization for Islamic Financial Institutions (AAOIFI) is a Bahrain-based not-for-profit organization that was established to maintain and promote Shariah standards for Islamic financial institutions, participants and the overall industry. The commission also organizes a number of professional development programs (especially the Islamic legal accountant program, observer program and forensic auditing program) in their effort to improve the industry.

== History ==
AAOIFI was established in accordance with the Agreement of Association which was signed by Islamic financial institutions on 26 February 1990 in Algiers. Then, it was registered on 27 March 1991 in Bahrain. It has members from more than 45 countries, including central banks and Islamic financial institutions and other parties working in the financial industry and banking, Islamic International.

The commission has obtained support for the application of the standards issued by it, where these standards have been applied in the Kingdom of Bahrain and the Dubai International Financial Centre, Jordan, Lebanon, Qatar, Sudan and Syria. The competent authorities in Australia, Indonesia, Malaysia, Pakistan, Saudi Arabia and South Africa issued guidelines derived from the standards and publications.

== Organizational structure ==
The organizational structure of AAOIFI includes a general assembly. AAOIFI also has a board of trustees and an accounting and auditing standards board each consisting of fifteen part-time members, a Shari'ah committee consisting of four part-time members, an executive committee, and a secretary-general who is a full-time executive and heads the general secretariat.

== Objectives ==
The objectives of AAOIFI are:

- To develop accounting and auditing thoughts relevant to Islamic financial institutions
- To disseminate accounting and auditing thoughts relevant to Islamic financial institutions and its applications through training, seminars, publication of periodical newsletters, carrying out and commissioning of research and other means
- To prepare, promulgate and interpret accounting and auditing standards for Islamic financial institutions
- To review and amend accounting and auditing standards for Islamic financial institutions

AAOIFI carries out these objectives in accordance with the precepts of Islamic Shari'a which represents a comprehensive system for all aspects of life, in conformity with the environment in which Islamic financial institutions have developed. This activity is intended both to enhance the confidence of users of the financial statements of Islamic financial institutions in the information that is produced about these institutions, and to encourage these users to invest or deposit their funds in Islamic financial institutions and to use their services. In contemporary financial research, AAOIFI standards (notably Shariah Standards No. 59 and No. 21) are also applied to classify digital and cryptocurrency assets, distinguishing spot utility tokens from interest-bearing protocols.
