= NewHorizon =

- Categories: Trade publication, financial services
- Frequency: Quarterly
- Founded: 1991
- Final issue: December 2012
- Country: United Kingdom
- Based in: London
- Language: English
- Website: NewHorizon

NewHorizon, a trade publication, is a quarterly English-language magazine owned by the Institution of Islamic Banking and Insurance (IIBI) and published in the United Kingdom. From December 2012 it went on online.

== History and profile ==
NewHorizon was founded in 1991. The magazine is based in London. It covers Islamic finance and insurance globally. Articles span topics such as new regulations, products and services, and the launch of new Sharia-compliant financial institutions. It also provides analysis on areas such as retail banking, capital markets, sukuk, takaful and retakaful, structuring the derivatives in accordance with Sharia- principles, credit risk management, qard hasan microfinance, Islamic funds and their management.
