= African Alliance Insurance Plc =

Nigerian insurance company

- Type: Public company
- Industry: Insurance
- Founded: 1960
- Headquarters: Lagos, Nigeria
- Area served: Nigeria
- Products: Life insurance, annuities, financial services
- Website: www.africanallianceplc.com

African Alliance Insurance Plc is a Nigerian life insurance company founded in 1960 and headquartered in Lagos. It provides life assurance, annuities, and other long-term financial products, and is listed on the Nigerian Exchange (NGX). The company is one of the older indigenous insurance firms in Nigeria.

The company has received significant public attention due to regulatory actions by the National Insurance Commission (NAICOM), including the dissolution of its board and management in 2024 over solvency concerns and failure to meet obligations to policyholders.

== History ==
African Alliance Insurance Plc was incorporated on 6 May 1960 as a private limited liability company and is regarded as one of the earliest indigenous life insurance companies in Nigeria. The company was established in partnership with Munich Reinsurance Company, which provided technical support in its early years.

Over the decades, the company expanded its operations across Nigeria, growing from a single-branch operation to a multi-branch insurer with a nationwide presence. By 2018, it operated more than 18 branches and served tens of thousands of policyholders.

African Alliance has also been associated with product innovation in Nigeria's insurance industry. In 2005, it became one of the early operators of Takaful (Islamic insurance) in the country.

The company was listed on NGX in 2009, transitioning into a publicly traded entity.

== Operations ==
African Alliance Insurance Plc specializes in life insurance and long-term financial products. Its offerings include annuities, group life insurance, and savings-oriented insurance products targeted at individuals and corporate clients.

The company operates primarily within Nigeria and has historically focused on retail and institutional life insurance markets.

== Regulatory intervention and governance issues ==
In 2024, African Alliance Insurance Plc became the subject of regulatory intervention by the National Insurance Commission (NAICOM), Nigeria's insurance regulator.

In July 2024, NAICOM directed the company to resolve outstanding claims and policyholder complaints, following reports of delays in annuity payments and other obligations.

In October 2024, NAICOM dissolved the board and management of the company, citing failure to meet regulatory requirements and inability to meet obligations to annuitants. The commission subsequently appointed an interim management team to oversee the company's operations.

Reports indicated that the regulatory action followed prolonged concerns about the company's financial condition, including solvency challenges and delays in meeting policyholder obligations.

== Financial challenges ==
In 2024, financial reports and industry analysis indicated that African Alliance Insurance Plc faced significant solvency issues, including a negative solvency position and difficulty meeting claims obligations.

These challenges were cited as contributing factors to regulatory intervention by NAICOM and heightened scrutiny of the company's operations.

== See also ==
- Insurance industry in Nigeria
- National Insurance Commission (Nigeria)
- Nigerian Exchange
