= Midsocbank =

Ugandan sharia bank

- Type: Private company
- Industry: Financial services
- Headquarters: Kampala, Uganda
- Key people: Haruna Sebaggala; Chairman
- Products: Sharia Loans & Investments
- Website: www.midsocbank.com

Midsocbank (Midsoc), also Midsoc Bank, is a proposed Islamic banking start-up institution in Uganda, the third-largest economy in the East African Community.

== Location ==
The headquarters of Midsocbank are located at 2D Nakasero Hill Road, in the central business district of Kampala, the capital and largest city of Uganda. The geographical coordinates of the bank's headquarters are: 0°19'31.0"N, 32°34'46.0"E (Latitude:0.325278; Longitude:32.579444).

== Overview ==
The founders and organizers of Midsoc Bank plan to establish a Sharia-compliant financial institution with the help of deep-pocketed International Islamic banking institutions, who would offer capital, managerial expertise, training and credibility to the new bank. At a later stage, the institution would diversify in other Islamic financing products, including insurance, re-insurance, sukuk, and other Islamic investments.

== Ownership ==
The proposed ownership of Midsoc Bank is as depicted in the table below:

Proposed Midsoc Bank Stock Ownership
Rank	Name of Owner	Percentage Ownership
1	Islamic Development Bank	33.3
2	Strategic Islamic Bank Investor	33.3
3	Local Ugandan Institutions & Individuals	33.4
	Total	100.00

== See also ==
- List of banks in Uganda
