= Bank Muamalat =

PT Bank Muamalat Indonesia Tbk.
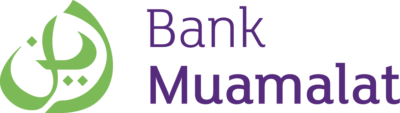

- Menara Muamalat (Muamalat Tower), Bank Muamalat headquarters in Jakarta
- Type: Public (Perseroan terbatas)
- Industry: Islamic banking and finance
- Founded: November 1, 1991; 34 years ago in Jakarta, Indonesia
- Headquarters: Jakarta, Indonesia
- Key people: Imam Teguh Saptono (President Director)
- Owner: Hajj Fund Management Agency (82.65%); Andre Mirza Hartawan (5.19%); Islamic Development Bank (2.04%); Others (10.11%)
- Website: www.bankmuamalat.co.id

Bank Muamalat Indonesia (BMI), (Bank Muamalat), is a commercial bank in Indonesia. It operates according to the principles of Islamic banking. Bank Muamalat serves nearly 3,000,000 customers throughout Indonesia and Malaysia.

== History ==
The bank was founded on 1 November 1991, based on the initiative of the Indonesian Council of Ulamas (MUI), under the auspices of the Government of Indonesia. Operations began on 1 May 1992. Foreign exchange service began in 1994.

== Principles ==
Funding products apply the principles of wadiah (deposit) and mudarabah (profit-sharing). Financing products apply the principles of bai’ (buy and sell), musharakah (equity sharing), mudarabah, and ijarah (rent).

== Ownership ==
Currently, 82.65% stake of Bank Muamalat is owned by an Indonesian government agency, Hajj Fund Management Agency (BPKH), Andre Mirza Hartawan (commissioner of the bank) with 5.19%, the Islamic Development Bank (IsDB) with 2.04% shares, and others (10.11%).

In 2022 the bank announced plans to be listed in the Indonesia Stock Exchange by late 2023.

== Network ==
The Bank has 239 service offices and is supported by an extensive service network consisting of 568 Muamalat ATM units, 120,000 ATM Bersama and Prima ATM networks, 51 Mobile Cash Car units.

== Management ==
=== Sharia Supervisory Board ===
Name	Position	Ref.
Sholahudin Al Aiyub	Chairman	
Siti Haniatunnisa	Member	
Agung Danarto	Member	

=== Board of Commissioners ===
Name	Position	Ref.
Sapto Amal Damandari	President Commissioner (Independent)	
Sartono	Independent Commissioner	
Andre Mirza Hartawan	Commissioner	

=== Board of Directors ===
Name	Position	Ref.
Imam Teguh Saptono	President Director	
Karno	Compliance Director	
Ricky Rikardo Mulyadi	Director	
