= Sharia and securities trading =

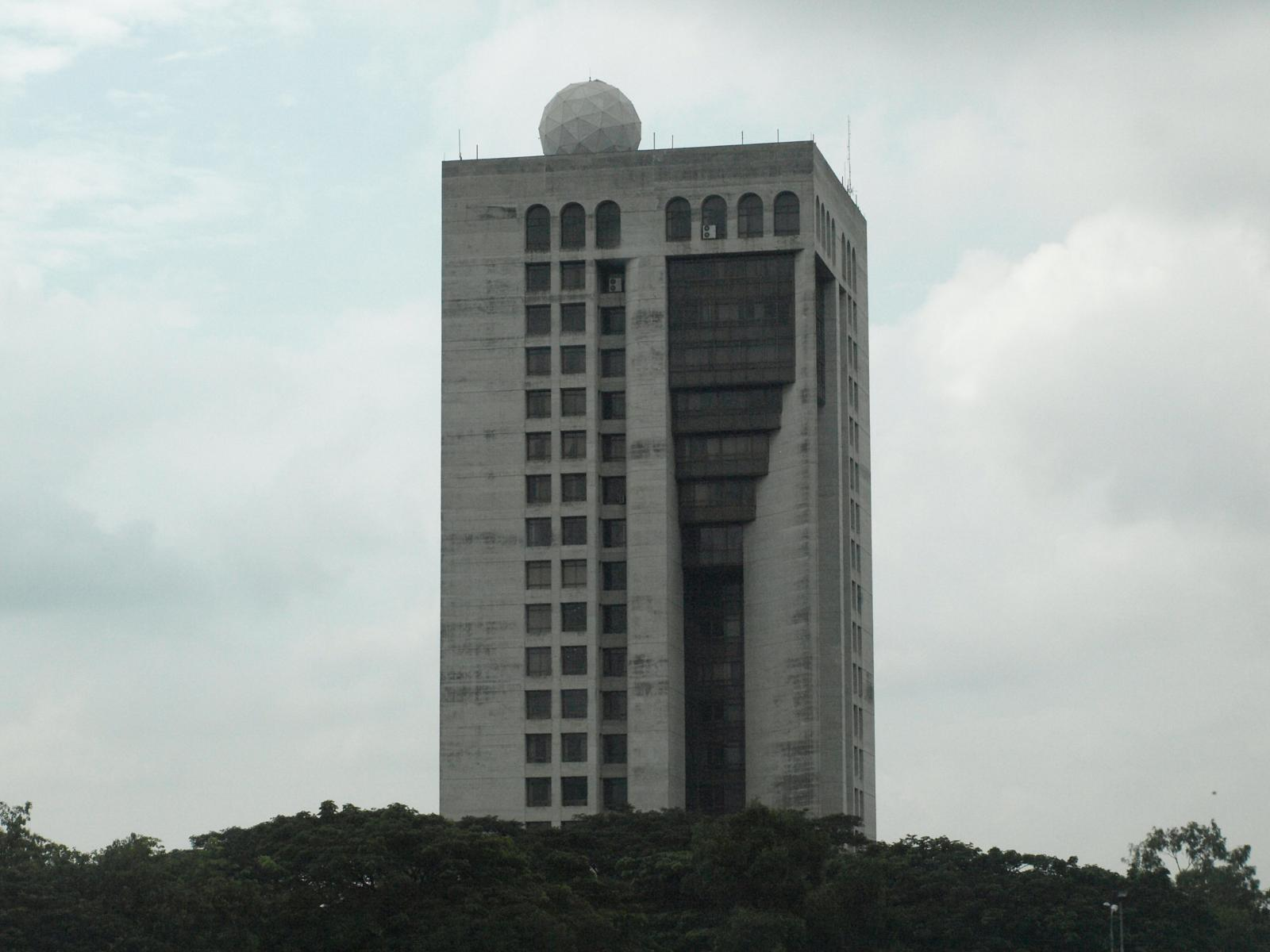
An Islamic Development Bank branch in Dhaka

Sharia and securities trading is the impact of conventional financial markets activity for those following the Islamic religion and particularly sharia law. Sharia practices ban riba (earning interest) and involvement in haram. It also forbids gambling (maisir) and excessive risk (bayu al-gharar). This, however has not stopped some in Islamic finance industry from using some of these instruments and activities, but their permissibility is a subject of "heated debate" within the religion.

Of particular interest are financial markets activities such as margin trading, short selling, day trading and derivative trading including futures, options and swaps which are considered by some as haram or forbidden.

== History ==
The Islamic banking and finance movement that developed in the late 20th century as part of Islamic schools and branches sought to create an alternative to conventional banking that complied with sharia (Islamic) law. Following sharia it banned from its practices riba (usury) – which it defined as any interest paid on all loans of money – and involvement in haram (forbidden) goods or services such as pork or alcohol. It also forbids gambling (maisir) and excessive risk (bayu al-gharar).

This meant that not only were interest-bearing loans, accounts, and bonds not allowed, but many financial instruments and activities common in conventional financial markets have been forbidden by most Muslim scholars because of their connection with maisir or gharar (Note: "`Gharar` is typically found in all derivative contracts, and, for this reason, Muslims are forbidden from trading in forwards, futures, options, short selling, or speculation in general where the future delivery value of an underlying asset is in doubt or uncertain.") (and also sometimes because they involve payment of interest). These include margin trading, (Note: "The ban on riba not only restricts the gamut of financial assets that can be included in halal portfolios, but also the way of acquiring them. Margin trading, of course, is out of the question".) day trading, short selling, and financial derivatives (Note: the "notional value" of the world's over-the-counter derivatives at the end of 2007, (according to the Bank of International Settlements) was $596 trillion. The gross market value of all outstanding derivatives was $14.5 trillion at the end of 2007.) such as forwards, futures, options, and swaps. (Note: Juan Sole and Andreas Jobst write that "legal scholars" have alleged that derivatives "contain excessive uncertainty (gharar)" and "encourage speculative behavior akin to gambling (maisir)".)

This, however has not stopped the Islamic finance industry from using some of these instruments and activities. While they often involve more risk than other investments and are used by speculators, they are defended as having useful economic functions. They are used in a large number of financial procedures, help manage risk and volatility (among other things), and provide incentives for employee productivity and innovation.

== Scriptural basis ==
The Quran states in aya 2:275 that "Allah has permitted trade and forbidden usury." But not all trade is allowed in Islam. The Qur'an prohibits gambling (maisir, games of chance involving money). While the Quran does not specifically mention gharar (risk), several hadith prohibit selling products like "the birds in the sky or the fish in the water", "the catch of the diver", or an "unborn calf in its mother's womb". These have been called bayu al-gharar (literally "trading in risk", defined as sales in which gharar is the major component).

Jurists have distinguished between this kind of forbidden gharar, and gharar considered minor (yasir) and so permissible (halal), but disagree (according to at least one source, Abu Umar Faruq Ahmad), over what constitutes each kind, and have not agreed on an exact definition of the meaning and concept of gharar.

Fiqh

The Hanafi and Shafi'i madhab (schools of jurisprudence) define gharar as "that whose consequences are hidden," the Hanbali school as "that whose consequences are unknown" or "that which is undeliverable, whether it exists or not." One modern scholar of Islam, Mustafa Al-Zarqa, defines gharar as "the sale of probable items whose existence or characteristics are not certain, due to the risky nature that makes the trade similar to gambling."

== Instruments and services ==
Commonly used financial instruments and practices that are often considered haram are:

- margin trading: borrowing money to buy shares of stock or other financial instruments;
- short selling: borrowing/renting shares of stock or some other instrument and selling it on the hope that it can be later repurchased at a lower price for a profit;
- day trading: very short term buying and selling of financial instruments; and
- derivatives: contracts that derive their value from the performance of an underlying asset; (These form a very large market. The "notional value" of the world's over-the-counter derivatives at the end of 2007, (according to the Bank of International Settlements) was $596 trillion. The gross market value of all outstanding derivatives was $14.5 trillion at the end of 2007.) The most commonly used derivative are:
  - CFD: contracts where traders don't own any shares or commodities of an organization. In these contracts, a profit or a loss is made through estimation of the future price (almost identically to the case with purchasing a real stock);
  - forwards: customized contracts to buy or sell an asset at a specified price on a future date. unlike futures contracts forward contracts are not traded on any exchanges;
  - futures: a legal agreement to buy or sell a particular commodity or financial instrument at a predetermined price at a specified time in the future;
  - options: contracts offering the buyer the right, but not the obligation, to buy (call) or sell (put) a security or other financial asset at an agreed-upon price (the strike price) during a certain period of time or on a specific date (exercise date);
  - swaps: contracts through which two parties exchange financial instruments to transfer risk.

=== Forbidding ===
Options, futures and "other derivatives" are "generally" not used in Islamic finance "because of the prohibition against maisir" (according to Thomson Reuters Practical Law). Margin trading, day trading, options, and futures are considered prohibited by sharia by the "majority of Islamic scholars" (according to Faleel Jamaldeen). Margin trading (because it involves borrowing money to buy what is being traded) involves interest payments in margin accounts, day trading (because it involves buying and selling financial instruments within the same trading day) is not concerned about the underlying product or economic activity of what is traded. One source (Investopedia) states "gharar is observed within derivative transactions such as forwards, futures and options, as well as in short selling and in speculation."

=== Derivatives ===
Juan Sole and Andreas Jobst write that "legal scholars" have alleged that derivatives "contain excessive uncertainty (gharar)" and "encourage speculative behavior akin to gambling (maisir)". According to economist Feisal Khan, derivatives (essentially securities whose price is dependent upon one or more underlying assets) "fail" the tests of Islamically permissible by lacking `materiality` (i.e. a direct link "to a real underlying economic transaction"), and involving speculation. Furthermore, "almost all conservative Sharia scholars" have ruled that `when applied to modern financial contracts, the prohibition of gharar eliminates futures, options, and some life assurance contracts`". Taqi Usmani forbids most futures transactions because their "delivery or possession is not intended and therefore the niah [goal, purpose] of the contracting parties is questionable". Investopedia states "In Islamic finance, most derivative contracts are forbidden and considered invalid because of the uncertainty involved in the future delivery of the underlying asset.

Faleel Jamaldeen writes that

the majority of Islamic scholars agree that options have features of speculation and gambling. In addition, the investor (second party) doesn't intend to hold the asset (which is generally considered crucial for an investment to be sharia-compliant). Based on these characteristics, most Islamic scholars believe that options are prohibited investments.

Short selling

Raj Bhala calls the short selling of stocks an example of common financial trading forbidden by sharia law — forbidden because the short seller borrows rather than owns the stock shorted. Taqi Usmani gives short selling as an example of an economic activity banned according to "divine restrictions". According to Humayon Dar (CEO of a shari'ah advisory firm), there is "no dispute by all main scholars" that short selling is haram.

Day trading

Jurist Yusuf Talal DeLorenzo notes in connection with injunctions against day trading that owning stocks for less than a day does not show a commitment to stewardship in ownership consistent with Islamic teaching. Focus Business Services of the UAE notes that the short period of "ownership" means day traders do not truly own what they trade, and furthermore pay interest, as marketable securities "generally have a multi-day settlement period, during which time the underlying instruments, while cleared, are not formally registered in the name of the purchaser. As day traders do not wait for settlement to complete, they are using a type of credit cushion provided by their broker."

Margin trading

Faleel Jamaldeen includes margin trading as one of the activities prohibited by the "majority of Islamic scholars", the reason being it involves borrowing funds to invest, and the lender of the funds charges interest. Moreover, losses can be greater than the amount borrowed, because margin trading amplifies the risk to the investor, increasing as percentage of debt or leverage increases.

== Defense and benefits ==
On the other hand, some Islamic finance practitioners and critics find benefit in at least some uses of derivatives and short selling. (Note: "Down payments" have been described as an Islamic equivalent for margin lending in short sales, but day trading has been defended by few if any in the Islamic banking and finance industry.)

At least one scholar (Mohammed Hashim Kamali) finds "nothing inherently objectionable" in selling and using options, which like other kinds of trade (he believes) is mubah (permissible) in fiqh, and "simply an extension of the basic liberty that the Quran has granted".

Economist critic Feisal Khan points out the "current relatively strict interpretation" by ulama of ahadith related to trade and commercial transactions have a wide-ranging impact on basic bank functions since "virtually all" financial instruments involve the interest rate "in some way or form". Thus the "current relatively strict interpretation of the hadith related trade and commercial transaction" would ban

"not only speculative financial transactions such as options and futures but also, for example, hedging by forward sale, interest-rate swaps, and any transaction involving items not physically in the possession of the seller (e.g. short sales) and all other forms of derivatives, i.e. financial securities that have no underlying real transactions. ... Activities such as bill discounting and government debt issue with a fixed coupon rate, inflation indexing, securitized debt obligations, and foreign exchange dealings would also be prohibited unless cumbersome intervening steps reminiscent of the medieval contractum trinius are undertaken."

Opposition by conservative Islamic scholars to use of derivatives as a form of gambling that violates sharia law exposes the Islamic Finance industry "to risks of increased volatility" when markets deteriorate, according to Y-Sing. Agil Natt, chief executive of the International Centre for Education in Islamic Finance, asks, "when does risk management end and gambling begin?"

One defender of the use of options in Islamic banking is Andreas A. Jobst of the International Monetary Fund, Along with Juan Sole, Jobst writes that "many" shariah scholars "now accept the application of hedging of actual exposures as an essential element of sound risk management and acknowledge the opportunity cost imposed by a lack of Islamic hedging tools." Jobst argues that using derivatives for risk diversification "contributes to the continuous discovery of the fair market price of risk, improves stability at all levels of the financial system and enhances general welfare." Specifically, issuing stock options to employees is a common way of increasing productivity.

== Use in Islamic finance ==
=== Short sales ===
Short-selling (Note: Transactions such as futures, options and swaps which are undertaken "by means of a derivative contract" involve a short position, but not a short sale "because no asset is actually delivered to the buyer".) has been forbidden by "conservative scholars" because it requires the selling of an item by the investor that they do not own. (Note: Feisal Khan states that "most scholars" held that short selling was "strictly forbidden" based on its lack of the `materiality` and its violation of `no speculation` provision, some Shariah-compliant hedge funds have created an Islamic-short sale ...") However "some Shariah-compliant hedge funds" in at least one country with a large financial sector (the United States) have created a way to short shares of stocks that has been "Shariah-certified", according to Feisal Khan. It requires a "down-payment" towards the shorted stock instead of "margin" (borrowed money).

Another source, Irfan A Naheem (a representative of a Sharia consulting firm) states that Islamic hedge fund managers have "developed alternative Shariah compliant strategies" with two instruments — "Salam and Arbun" — being "the Islamic alternatives for the conventional short selling."

Naheem argues that the hadith (where the Islamic prophet Muhammad commands: "sell not what is not with you") — which is traditionally interpreted by Muslims as an injunction not to sell what you do not own — actually may refer only to the sale of items that are unique or not commonly available. If something is readily available (such as an instrument is in a short sale) then borrowing and selling is not forbidden (Naheem contends).

Criticism

El-Gamal criticizes this practice as an imitation of conventional "ribawi" finance in "synthesizing" Islamic versions of short sales (as well as other instruments). Feisal Khan and El-Gamal also complain that using a "down-payment" rather than borrowed "margin" funds in shorting a stock is simply a workaround little different than the conventional process, but charging "substantially higher fees".

=== Derivatives ===
As of 2013 the Islamic derivatives market was "in its infancy" and its size was not known. The Islamic derivatives — or at least derivatives declared sharia compliant — include swaps, and put and call options.

Criticism

According to critic of Islamic finance, Mahmoud A. El-Gamal, one way the Islamic finance industry gets around prohibitions on the use of options is to use conventional banks/financers as a "buffer" between the haram income and its sharia obedient customers — employing conventional banks as partners or advisers and paying them with the haram gains from derivatives.

==== Swaps ====
Faleel Jamaldeen describes the Islamic swap market as being composed of two kinds of swaps:

- profit rate swap: "based on exchanging fixed for floating rate profits" (Conventional finance has "interest rate swaps". As of 2007, this kind of swap had the largest market of any variety of swaps.)
- cross-currency swap: These are used by investors to "transfer currency fluctuation risk among themselves."

(Versions of both of these two swaps — called the Islamic Profit Rate Swap and the Islamic Cross Currency Swap — as well as a version of a derivative called the Islamic Forward Rate Agreement, are offered by one Islamic bank (Standard Chartered Saadiq Malaysia)).

Standards

According to Harris Irfan, the Islamic finance market is "awash" with contracts for the "profit rate swap". By 2010 they had become common enough for a global standard to be developed by the Bahrain-based International Islamic Financial Market and New York-based International Swaps and Derivatives Association This standard, called the Tahawwut or the "Hedging Master Agreement" provides a structure under which institutions can trade derivatives such as profit-rate and currency swaps, or as the ISDA/IIFM describes it, is

"designed to govern the legal and credit relationship between two parties embarking on a bilateral trading relationship involving Shari’a-compliant hedging transactions based on murabaha transactions."

Juan Sole and Andreas Jobst describe the standard as an "innovative" pan-madhab agreement spanning "all five major schools of Islamic jurisprudence". It has "strong parallels" to the 2002 ISDA Master and Schedule of the conventional banking industry. Irfan urges Islamic financers to use this Tahawwut or "Hedging Master Agreement" and benefit from the cost saving of its standardization, but lamented that it has not being widely used as of 2015.

In March 2012 the ISDA and IIFM issue another product standard, the ISDA/IIFM Mubadalatul Arbaah, to provide "an Islamic risk mitigation framework for the industry".

Another "hedging tool" (but not a standard) is the "Islamic Profit Rate Swap" (IPRS) which "allows two parties to exchange a series of profit payments in a single currency in exchange for another series of payments in the same currency". It has been described by the Islamic Bankers Resource Centre as an "alternative" to the Tawarruq Murabaha and similar to it except that the underlying assets it uses for the transaction are not actual commodities but the Mudharabah Islamic Interbank ("MII"), and it uses Bai Inah contracts (Note: i.e. "a loan in the form of a sale", where a financier/bank buys some asset from the customer on spot basis; the financier's payment constitutes the "loan"; the customers repurchase of their asset later on constitutes repayment of the loan.) instead of Murabaha. The IPRS involves "three Shariah concepts": the Wa'd, the Bai’ Inah and the Muqassah. IPRS has been used quite a bit in Malaysia but its Bai Inah contract is "rejected" in the Middle Eastern countries.

A standard used "to facilitate" the Islamic Profit Rate Swap is the Islamic Derivative Master Agreement (IDMA), issued by Malaysia's central bank, the Bank Negara Malaysia, in 2007.

==== Wa'd ====
Wa'd (literally "promise"), is a principle that has come to underpin or to structure shariah-compliant hedging instruments or derivatives that provide substitutes for conventional hedging products such as forward currency contracts and currency swaps. However, Wa'd has been called "controversial", and its products criticized as mimicking conventional ones and "'Islamic' in form alone".

A "Double Wa'd" (literally "double promise") is a derivative that allows an investor to invest in and receive a return linked to a financial benchmark — such as an index of interest-bearing US corporate bonds — that would normally be in violation of Shariah. The investor's cash goes to a "special purpose entity" and in return they receive a certificate to execute the derivative. This involves a promise that on an agreed day in the future the investor will receive a return linked to the chosen benchmark. (If the interest-bearing US corporate bond index has gained 10%, for example, the investment gains 10% although no corporate bonds have been purchased.) Several features of the double wa'd (allegedly) make the derivative sharia compliant:

- The investor's cash invested in the special purpose entity goes to a segregated account to avoid commingling,
- the cash buys a shariah compliant asset that is liquid and tradable — such as shares in a big company (like Microsoft) that has low levels of interest bearing debt (high levels being against shariah).
- the contract involves two mutually exclusive promises (hence "double"):
1. that on an agreed day in the future the investor will receive a return linked to a given benchmark;
2. that the bank will purchase the investor's asset "for a price equal to the benchmark"

So despite the fact that benchmark involves non-compliant investments, the contract is not "bilateral" (something forbidden by sharia), because "the two undertaking promised are mutually exclusive", and this (proponents say) makes it in compliance with shariah.

Criticism

In 2007, Yusuf DeLorenzo (chief Sharia officer at Shariah Capital at the time) issued a fatwa disapproving of the double wa'd in situations where the assets reflected in the benchmark were not halal, but this has not curtailed its use. (Note: Although not entirely in agreement with Yusuf DeLorenzo, the shariah board head (Hussain Hamed Hassan) at the firm where the swap was developed, (Deutsche Bank) "took pains to ensure that he [was] involved in both the development and distribution phases of each new product ... But it was impossible to beat the bankers. Across the industry, other firms picked up on the methodology and began issuing their own products many of whom were not as intimately familiar with the structure. Corners were cut and products of dubious provenance continued to pour out from the sales desks of less scrupulous institutions.")

==== Put and call options ====
Like the Islamic equivalent for short sales, a number of Islamic finance institutions have been using the down-payment sale or urbun as an Sharia-compliant alternative to the conventional call option. (Note: options are a "common form" of a derivative.) In this mode the Islamic equivalent of the option "premium" is known as a "down-payment", and the equivalent of the "strike price" is called the "preset price".

With a conventional call option the investor pays a premium for an "option" (the right but not the obligation) to buy shares of stock (bonds, currency, and other assets may also be shorted) in the hope that the stock's market price will rise above the strike price before the option expires. If it does, their profit is the difference between the two prices minus the premium. If it does not, their loss is the cost of the premium. When the Islamic investor uses an urbun they make a down payment on shares or asset sale in hope the price will rise above the "preset price". If it does not their loss is the down-payment which they have the right to forfeit.

A put option (i.e. where the seller has the right but not the obligation to sell at a preset price by some point in the future, and so will profit if the price of the underlying asset falls below that price) is called a `reverse urbun` in Islamic finance.

Criticism

Sherif Ayoub criticizes the practice of labeling what is effectively an option premium a "down payment" as "creative" but misleading. He points out that how and why their prices are calculated is very different. The down payment is intended as security for the financer — proof that the buyer has "skin in the game". The premium in contrast is intended to ensure that (on average) the premiums paid to the seller exceed the losses from exercised options. The down payment is set as a percentage of the cost of the item being purchased. The premium has no relation to the price of the stock but is based on the difference between the strike price and the "actual price of the stock in the market at contract maturity".

According to El-Gamal, "most analysts" who examine the differences between the urbun down payment and the call option have "concluded that the latter cannot be synthesized from the former." Feisal Khan quotes Ayoub as describing the use of the urbun down payment for a call option as "extremely controversial among `traditional`" Islamic banking and finance scholars.

== See also ==
- Islamic banking and finance
- Profit and loss sharing
- Islamic economics
- Islamic finance products, services and contracts
- Riba
- Muamalat
