= Sukuk =

Financial instruments in Islamic law

Sukuk (Arabic: صكوك, romanized: ṣukūk; plural (Note: In common usage outside of Arabic-speaking countries, the word "sukuk" is often used both as singular as well as plural.) of Arabic: صك, romanized: ṣakk, lit. 'legal instrument, deed, cheque') is the Arabic name for financial certificates, also commonly referred to as "sharia compliant" bonds. Sukuk are defined by the AAOIFI (Accounting and Auditing Organization for Islamic Financial Institutions) as "securities of equal denomination representing individual ownership interests in a portfolio of eligible existing or future assets." (Note: AAOIFI Standard 17, quoted in Khan (2013)) The Fiqh academy of the OIC legitimized the use of sukuk in February 1988.

Sukuk were developed as an alternative to conventional bonds, which are not permissible in Islam as they pay interest (prohibited or discouraged as Riba, or usury), and also may finance businesses involved in activities not permitted under sharia (gambling, alcohol, pork, etc.). Sukuk securities are structured to comply with sharia by paying profit, not interest—generally by involving a tangible asset in the investment. For example, sukuk securities may have partial ownership of a property built by the investment company (and held in a Special Purpose Vehicle), so that sukuk holders can collect the property's profit as rent (which is allowed under Islamic law). Because they represent ownership of real assets and (at least in theory) do not guarantee repayment of initial investment, sukuk resemble equity instruments, but like a bond (and unlike equity) regular payments cease upon their expiration. However, most sukuk are "asset-based" rather than "asset-backed"—their assets are not truly owned by their Special Purpose Vehicle, and their holders have recourse to the originator if there is a shortfall in payments.

Different types of sukuk are based on different types of Islamic contract (murabaha, ijarah, istisna, musharaka, istithmar, etc.) depending on the project the sukuk is financing.

According to the State of the Global Islamic Economy Report 2016/17, of the $2.004 trillion of assets being managed in a sharia compliant manner in 2014, $342 billion were sukuk, being made up of 2,354 sukuk issues.

== Etymology ==
The Arabic term ṣakk was borrowed from Classical Persian چک (čak, “legal document, document, contract, deed of sale, bill”).

== History ==
In the classical period of Islam, sakk (sukuk) meant any document representing a contract or conveyance of rights, obligations or monies done in conformity with Shariah. The term was used to refer to financial obligations originating from trade and other commercial activities in the Islamic pre-modern period.

According to Camille Paldi, the first sukuk transaction took place in Damascus in its Great Mosque in the 7th century AD. Muslim traders are known to have used the cheque or ṣakk system since the time of Harun al-Rashid (9th century) of the Abbasid Caliphate.

The modern Western word "cheque" appears to have been derived from "sakk" (singular of sukuk), (Note: The UK based educational project and exhibition exploring the Muslim contributions to building the foundations of Modern Civilisation, called "1001 Inventions: Discover the Muslim Heritage in Our World", also confirmed that the word "cheque" comes from "sakk".) which during the Middle Ages referred to a written agreement "to pay for goods when they were delivered" and was used to "avoid money having to be transported across dangerous terrain".

Modern

Answering a need to provide short and medium term instruments so that balance sheets of Islamic financial institutions could be more liquid, the Fiqh academy of the OIC (Organization of Islamic Countries) legitimized the use of sukuk in February 1988.

In 1990 one of the first contemporary sukuk—worth RM125 million—was issued by Malaysia Shell MDS Sdn Bhd, on the basis of bai' bithaman ajil. The next major sukuk issuances were by Kuala Lumpur International Airport for RM2.2 billion each in 1996 and 1997. In 2000, the government of Sudan issued domestic sovereign short-term sukuk worth 77 million Sudanese pounds on the basis of musharaka. In 2001, the sukuk market went international with the issuance of the first US-dollar-denominated ijara sukuk, worth $100 million, by the Central Bank of Bahrain. Since then many sovereign and corporate sukuk issues have been offered in various jurisdictions.

To standardize the growing market, the AAOIF issued "Shari’ah Standard No.17" on "Investment Sukuk" in May 2003. It became effective starting 1 January 2004.

In 2025, the AAOIF proposed changes to its Shariah Standard 62 that could significantly reshape the global sukuk market, which has grown to over $1 trillion. The new framework advocates a shift from commonly used "asset-based" sukuk structures, where investors have beneficial interests but not legal ownership, to "asset-backed" models requiring full legal transfer of underlying assets. While intended to enhance Shariah compliance by distancing sukuk from conventional debt instruments, the proposed changes raise concerns about legal feasibility, investor appetite, and market fragmentation. Critics warn that inconsistent implementation across jurisdictions could introduce legal uncertainty, reduce liquidity, and deter institutional investors reliant on credit ratings. AAOIFI is expected to finalize the standard in 2025 after reviewing industry feedback.

== Industry ==
International Sukuk Issuance
| 2007 | $13.8 billion |
| 2008 | $2.14 billion |
| 2009 | $7.47 billion |
| 2010 | $5.35 billion |
| 2011 | ~$80 billion |
| 2012 | <$150 billion |
| 2013 | >$120 billion |
| 2014 | ~$130 billion |
| 2015 | >$100 billion |
| 2016 | $72.9 billion |
SOURCES: 2012 International Islamic Financial Market report p. 12, Forbes,

As of early 2017, there were US$328 billion worth of sukuk outstanding worldwide. As of the end of 2016, there were about 146 US dollar-denominated, Islamic fixed income securities issued in the global markets, that were investment-grade, and had a duration of at least one year. These securities—which make up the Citi Sukuk Index—had an average maturity of 4.54 years, and most were issued by governments. The top four issuers by market weight—making up over 40% of the market—were: ISLAMIC DEVELOPMENT BANK, PERUSAHAAN PENERBIT SBSN INDOIII, SAUDI ELECTRICITY CO, and SOQ SUKUK A QSC. About 3/4 of the sukuk market is domestic, not international. Most sukuk are not investment grade however, and as of 2015, there were 2,354 sukuk issues in total, including local currency denominated, non-global market sukuk, according to Thomson Reuters & Dinar Standard. According to the Malaysian International Islamic Financial Centre, as of 2013 the biggest issuers of sukuk were governments (65.6%), and the second largest were power and utility companies (13.6%).

=== Secondary market ===
Sukuk securities tend to be bought and held. As a result, few securities enter the secondary market to be traded. Furthermore, only public sukuk are able to enter this market, as they are listed on stock exchanges.

The secondary market, though still developing, remains a niche segment with virtually all of the trading done at the institutional level. The size of the secondary market remains unknown, though LMC Bahrain states they traded $55.5 million of sukuk in 2007. As of July 2014 sukuk.com listed fifteen sukuk on the secondary market for Gulf sukuk.

== Principles ==
Ali Arsalan Tariq states that Islamic finance—including sukuk—is based on a set of several prohibitions:

1. Transactions in unethical goods and services;
2. Earning returns from a loan contract (riba/interest);
3. Compensation-based restructuring of debts;
4. Excessive uncertainty in contracts (gharar);
5. Gambling and chance-based games (qimar);
6. Trading in debt contracts at discount, and;
7. Forward foreign exchange transactions.

As Shari’ah considers money to be a measuring tool for value and not an asset in itself, it requires that one should not receive income from money (or anything that has the genus of money) alone, as this (simplistically, interest) is "riba", and forbidden. From a Sharia perspective, certificates of debt are not tradable except at their par value (although a different view is held by many in Malaysia).

While a bond is a contractual debt obligation of the issuer to pay to bondholders, on certain specified dates, interest and principal, a sukuk is a certificate giving its holders an undivided beneficial ownership in the underlying assets. Consequently, sukuk holders are entitled to share in the revenues generated by the sukuk assets as well as being entitled to share in the proceeds of the realization of the sukuk assets.

=== Similarities with bonds ===
- Sukuk and bonds are sold to investors who receive a stream of payments (Note: An exception is the "zero coupon" bond or sukuk where there is no payout or coupon but the value of the bond/sukuk increases until maturity.) until the date of the maturity of the sukuk or bond, at which time they get their original investment (in the case of sukuk a full payment is not guaranteed) back.
- Sukuk and bonds are intended to provide investment with less risk than equities (such as shares of stock) and so are often used to "balance a portfolio" of investment instruments.
- Both sukuk and bond issuers must issue a disclosure document known as a prospectus to describe the security they are selling.
- To give investors an idea of how much risk is involved in particular sukuk/bonds, rating agencies rate the credit worthiness of the issuers of the sukuk/bond.
- Both sukuk and bonds are initially sold by their original issuers. After that they (or some sukuk and bonds) may be bought and sold by brokers and agents, mostly on the over-the-counter (OTC) market, but are also available on some stock exchanges around the world.

=== Differences from bonds ===
- Ownership: Sukuk should indicate partial ownership of an asset. Bonds indicate a debt obligation.
- Compliance: The assets that back sukuk should be compliant with Shariah. Bonds need only comply with the laws of country/locality they are issued in.
- Pricing: The face value of a sukuk is priced according to the value of the assets backing them. Bond pricing is based on credit rating, i.e. the issuer's credit worthiness.
- Rewards and risks: Sukuk can increase in value when the underlying assets increase in value. Returns from bonds correspond to fixed interest. (Because most bonds' interest rates are fixed, most increase in value when the market interest rates fall.)
- Sales: When you sell sukuk, you are selling ownership in the assets backing them. (In instances where the certificate represents a debt to the holder, the certificate will not be tradable on the secondary market and instead should be held until maturity.) The sale of bonds is the sale of debt.
- Principal: Sukuk investors (in theory) share the risk of the underlying asset and may not get all their initial investment (the face value of the sukuk) back. (The value payable to the holder on maturity should be the current market value of the assets or enterprise and not the principal originally invested, according to Taqi Usamani.) Bond investors are guaranteed the return of their initial investment/principal. In practice some sukuk are issued with repurchase guarantees.
- Conventional bonds are issued with underwriters. Sukuk underwriters do not usually conduct the issuance and may not be required. Special Purpose Vehicles are used as the trustee/issuer of the sukuk.

== Definitions, structure and characteristics ==
Definitions

The AAOIFI (Accounting and Auditing Organization for Islamic Financial Institutions, the body which issues standards on accounting, auditing, governance, ethical, and Shari'a standards) defines sukuk as "securities of equal denomination representing individual ownership interests in a portfolio of eligible existing or future assets," (Note: AAOIFI Standard 17, quoted in Khan (2013)) or "'certificates of equal value representing undivided shares in the ownership of tangible assets, usufructs and services or (in the ownership of) the assets of particular projects or special investment activity'."

The Islamic Financial Services Board defines sukuk as:

certificates with each sakk representing a proportional undivided ownership right in tangible assets, or a pool of predominantly tangible assets, or a business venture. These assets may be in a specific project or investment activity in accordance with Sharia rules and principles.

The Securities Commission of Malaysia defined sukuk as a document or certificate which represents the value of an asset.

Need

Sharia forbids both the trading of short-term debt instruments except at face value, and the drawing upon the established interbank money markets (both being seen as involving interest and excessive uncertainty (gharar)). As a consequence, prior to the development of the sukuk market, the balance sheets of Islamic financial institutions tended to be highly illiquid and lacking in short and medium term investment opportunities for their current assets.

Structure and characteristics

Sukuk are structured in several different ways. (The AAOIFI has laid down 14 different types of sukuk.) While a conventional bond is a promise to repay a loan, sukuk constitute partial ownership in a debt, asset, project, business or investment.

- debt (sukuk murabaha). These sukuk are not common because their payments to investors represent debt and are therefore not tradable or negotiable according to sharia. (If diluted with other non-murahaha sukuk in a mixed portfolio they may be traded).
- asset (sukuk al ijarah). These are essentially rental or lease contracts, or conventional lease-revenue bonds. With these sukuk, the borrower's tangible asset is 'sold' to the financier and then 'leased' back to the borrowers. The borrowers then make regular payments back to the financiers from the income stream generated by the asset. They are the most common type of sukuk (as of 2015), and have been described (by Faleel Jamaldeen) as well known because of there simplicity, tradability and ability to provide a fixed flow of income.
- asset at a future date (sukuk al-salam). In this sukuk the SPV does not buy an asset but agrees to buy one at a future date in exchange for advance payments. The asset is then sold in the future for its cost plus a profit by an agent. On (or before) the date agreed to in the contract, the seller delivers the asset to the agent, who sells the asset and passes the proceeds (minus expenses/fees) on to the SPV, which distributes the proceeds to the sukuk holders. Sukuk al-salam are (at least usually) used to support a company's short term liquidity requirements. Holders receive payment not with a regular flow of income, but at maturity—similar to a zero-coupon bond. An example of this kind of sukuk is the 91-day CBB Sukuk Al-Salam issued by Central Bank of Bahrain.
- project (Sukuk al istisna). These sukuk are complex and cannot be traded in the secondary market or sold to a third party for less than its face value.
- business (sukuk al musharaka). These sukuk holders are also the owners of the originator issuing the sukuk and participate in the decision-making. These sukuk can be traded in the secondary market.
- or investment (sukuk al istithmar).

The most commonly used sukuk structures replicate the cash flows of conventional bonds. Such structures are listed on exchanges, commonly the Luxembourg Stock Exchange and London Stock Exchange in Europe, and made tradable through conventional organisations like Euroclear Bank or Clearstream Banking SA. A key technique to achieve capital protection without amounting to a loan is a binding promise to repurchase certain assets; e.g. in the case of sukuk al ijarah, by the issuer. In the meantime rent is paid, which is often benchmarked to an interest rate (LIBOR is the most common though its use is criticized by some Sharia scholars).

The most accepted structure, which is tradable, is the sukuk al ijarah. Debt certificates can only be bought before the finance occurs and then held to maturity, from an Islamic perspective. This is critical for debt trading at market value without incurring the prohibited riba (interest on money).

=== Issuing and payment process ===
The step-by-step process of issuing a sukuk based on an asset is:

1. The originator—a business firm requiring capital—creates a special purpose vehicle (SPV), an independent entity and structures. The SPV protects the sukuk assets from creditors if the originator has financial troubles. It specifies what asset or activity the sukuk will support, how large the issuance of sukuk will be, their face amounts, interest rates, and maturity date. SPVs are often located in "tax-efficient jurisdictions" such as Bahrain, Luxembourg or the Cayman Islands.
2. The SPV issues the sukuk offering it for sale to investors with an agreement spelling out the relationship between obligator and sukuk holders (depending on the type of sukuk this can be lessor and lessee, partner, etc.).
3. With the money from the sale of sukuk certificates, the SPV passes the offering to the originator who makes the sharia compliant asset purchase, lease, joint venture, etc. (again depending on the type of sukuk).
4. The SPV purchases assets (such as land, building, machinery, etc.) from the originator.
5. The sale proceeds are paid to the originator/debtor as the price of the assets.
6. The SPV, acting as a trustee on behalf of the sukuk holders, arranges to lease the assets back to the originator, who pays the sukuk holders the lease income.
7. The originator buys back the asset from the SPV at a nominal price on termination of the lease.

In this type of sukuk, the fixed interest of a conventional bond is replaced by fixed lease income. Islamic economist Muhammad Akram Khan complains that sukuk are "different from conventional finance in form and formalities rather than substance", and "may even be more expensive" for the income provided than a conventional bond.

=== Example ===
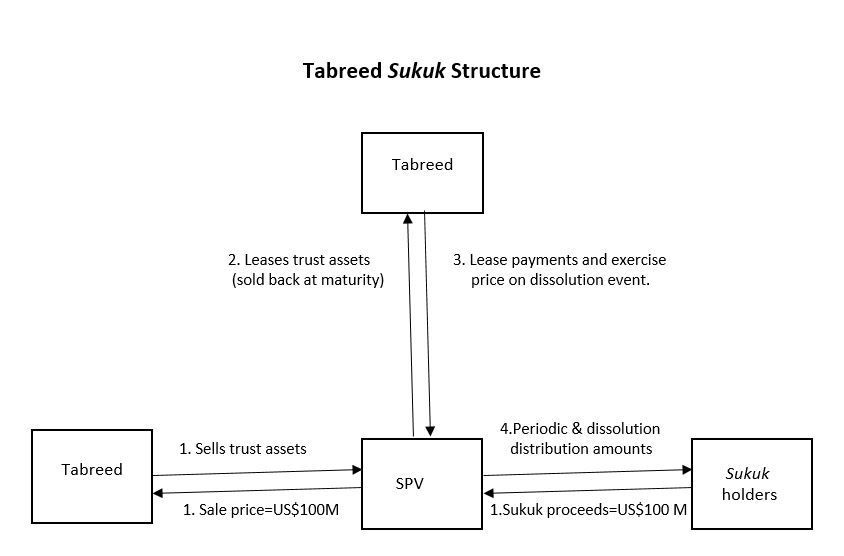
Structure of a $100 million sukuk issued by the Tabreed Financing Corporation in March 2004

An example of a sukuk was a $100 million security used to finance the construction and delivery of cooling plants in Abu Dhabi. This sukuk had an istisna'a and ijarah structure and was issued by the Tabreed Financing Corporation (or National Central Cooling Company PJSC) in March 2004.

- Tabreed created an SPV (incorporated in the Cayman Islands), which sold certificates of sukuk bonds.
- With the proceeds of this sale it bought some partially completed central cooling plants ("assets" held in trust for the sukuk). (1)
- The SPV leased the trust assets to the Tabreed; (2)
- which made rental payments to the SPV; (3)
- which passed the payments on to sukuk holders (4).
- When the sukuk matured the trust assets were bought back from the SPV and the sukuk holders got their principal back.

If some "dissolution event" (e.g. destruction of the leased property) had interrupted the payment of rent this would have prompted "the continuation of payments in the form of repurchase price". This reduces the risk structure of the sukuk to that (or near that) of conventional bonds, which permits the sukuk to earn the same or close to the same credit ratings that conventional bonds earn. Consequently, they are able to be sold at an interest rate lower than they might be otherwise, although their transactions costs are higher than conventional bonds because of the creation of SPVs, as well as payment of various jurists' and legal fees for structuring the bond issuance.

== Challenges, criticism and controversy ==
=== Challenges ===
According to a 2015 IMF report, the supply of sukuk "falls short of demand" and, with some exceptions, "issuance takes place without a comprehensive strategy to develop the domestic market".

Sukuk are seen as well-suited for infrastructure financing because of their risk-sharing property could also help fill financing gaps. National authorities should, therefore, focus on developing the necessary infrastructure, including promoting true securitization and enhanced clarity over investors' rights, and on stepping up regular sovereign issuance to provide a benchmark for the private sector. Increased sovereign issuance should be underpinned by sound public financial management.

"Key challenges" to the Islamic finance industry as a whole—including sukuk—as of 2016 include (according to the State of the Global Islamic Economy Report, 2015/16 and the IMF):

- "Low levels" of awareness and understanding of Islamic finance products and services among the public, leading them to not buy.
- A "scarcity of Shariah-compliant monetary policy instruments" and a lack of understanding of "the monetary transmission mechanism".
- "Complex financial products and corporate structures" in some countries/jurisdictions because "regulatory and supervisory frameworks" do not "address the unique risks of the industry". Consequently, what is needed is "increased regulatory clarity and harmonization, better cooperation between Islamic and conventional financial standard-setters, and further improvement of supervisory tools".
- "Underdeveloped" safety nets and resolution frameworks. In many places these include complete Islamic deposit insurance systems where premiums are invested in Shariah-compliant assets, or Shariah-compliant "lenders-of-last-resort".
- Regulators who "do not always have the capacity (or willingness) to ensure Shariah compliance."

Defaults

In three years during and following the 2008 financial crisis—2008, 2009, 2010—there were at least 21 substantial sukuk defaults, and several large near defaults such as that of Dubai World, which was saved by a $10 billion loan from Abu Dhabi As of 2009, there were a number of cases where the sukuk had defaulted or were in serious trouble. In May 2009, Investment Dar of Kuwait defaulted on $100 million sukuk. Saad Group set up a committee to restructure the $650 million Golden Belt 1 sukuk. Standard & Poor's cut the rating of that sukuk "owing to the non-availability of vital information". Another source (Mushtak Parker) claims there "have been a mere three or four" sukuk defaults—the East Cameron sukuk in Louisiana (a dispute relating to the profit-sharing arrangement of the instrument); the Investment Dar sukuk (to do with "cash flow problems of the company and its subsidiaries, albeit it had a side dispute with an investor, Blom Bank relating to the shariah aspects of the contracts"); and the "notorious" Saad/Al Gosaibi sukuk default ("more a market failure and an internecine dispute between the two Saudi partners").

Protection from originator's default

Fitch Ratings, one of the three major bond rating agencies for the US, has indicated doubts about the "validity" of transfer of assets from the originator in sukuk in the "event of an insolvency of the originator" and attempts by creditors to seize the assets. "Fitch has not reviewed any transaction to date that would satisfy these requirements."

Underscoring Fitch's concern was the bankruptcy of East Cameron Partners ECP, which issued a multiple-award-winning sukuk in 2006 but filed for bankruptcy in October 2008, prompting a legal dispute about the creditors' right to $167.67 million in sukuk assets. (The final decision of the case "did not clearly resolve this issue".) Another major rating agency, S&P, downgraded the sukuk of Dubai Islamic Bank and Sharjah Islamic Bank.

According to Ibrahim Warde, as of 2010,

What is still unclear is what happens to sukuk when they fail—an issue that has not been tested in court. In Malaysia, some sukuk issues have junk status, and two other sukuk are already in default: the Eastern Cameron Gas company in the United States and Investment Dar of Kuwait. One of the unresolved questions is whether sukuk holders should stand in the line of creditors or in the line of the owners of underlying assets.

In reviewing cases of sukuk defaults and bankruptcies, Muddassir Siddiqui complained that:

Through reading many cases that have so far been litigated in courts around the world, I have found that in almost all cases, the courts have struggled to reconcile the substance and form of the contract. Was it a sale, lease, construction or partnership contract or a financing arrangement between the parties?

According to Rodney Wilson, when sukuk payments are delayed or fail, "the means of redress are potentially more complex than for conventional notes and bonds". In particular "under Shari’ah leniency towards debtors is favoured", which inevitably raises moral hazard problems.

Discrediting Sharia compliance

There have been at least two cases of companies seeking to restructure their debt (i.e. pay creditors less), claiming that debt they had issued was not in compliance with sharia. In a 2009 court filing Investment Dar, a Kuwaiti company, claimed a transaction "was taking deposits at interest".

In June 2017, the independent gas company Dana Gas PJSC declared two of its sukuk—with a total worth of $700 million—no longer sharia compliant, and offered to exchange the sukuk with new ones which would pay "less than half of the current profit rates and without a conversion feature". The sukuk were issued in 2013 and due to mature on 30 October 2017. Dana refused to make payments on them, alleging that "changes in Islamic finance over recent years have made the bonds unlawful in the UAE". A month earlier, Dana had announced plans to restructure the debt, stating it needed to "focus on short to medium-term cash preservation." Sukuk holders, represented by fund manager BlackRock and Deutsche Bank, have been arguing against Dana in a London High Court. In October 2017, a court in the emirate of Sharjah in the UAE—where Dana had filed for protection—postponed a ruling on the sukuk. The issue has been called "one of the greatest challenges that the Islamic finance industry has faced in recent times", but the idea that the case is "a blow to Islamic finance" has also been dismissed as "poppycock".

=== Criticism and controversy ===
Sukuk have been criticized as evading the restrictions on riba and imitating conventional bonds.

In February 2008, the AAOIFI's board of scholars, led by Sheik Taqi Usmani, stated that as many as 85 percent of sukuk sold to date may not comply with all the precepts of Shariah. In a paper entitled "Sukuk and their Contemporary Applications" released in November 2007, Usmani identified the following three key structuring elements that differentiate sukuk from conventional bonds:

- Sukuk must represent ownership shares in assets or commercial or industrial enterprises that bring profits or revenues
- Payments to sukuk holders should be the share of profits (after costs) of the assets or enterprise
- The value payable to the sukuk holder on maturity should be the current market value of the assets or enterprise and not the principal originally invested.

Usmani stated that by complex mechanisms sukuk had taken on the same characteristics as conventional interest-bearing bonds, as they do not return to investors more than a fixed percentage of the principal, based on interest rates, while guaranteeing the return of investors' principal at maturity. Usmani's estimate that 85% of all sukuk in issuance were not Shariah-compliant was based on the existence of guaranteed returns and/or repurchase obligations from the issuer—a violation of shariah.

Following Usmani's criticisms the global sukuk market shrunk from US$50 billion in 2007 to approximately $14.9 billion in 2008, although how much of this was due to his criticisms or the 2008 financial crisis is a matter of debate.

The Financial Times has described this as an "ongoing" debate over "form versus substance" in Islamic finance, identifying two kinds of sukuk—"asset-backed" sukuk and the more numerous, less strict, allegedly non-compliant "asset based" sukuk. In an "asset-backed" sukuk there is "a true sale between the originator and the special purpose vehicle (SPV) that issues the sukuk and sukuk holders do not have recourse to the originator". Asset prices may vary over time. In contrast "asset-based" sukuk do give their holders recourse to the originator, and so more closely resemble conventional bonds.

Other critics include non-orthodox economist Mahmoud El-Gamal, who has complained that while providers of sukuk (and other Islamic finance instruments) will often describe their "distinguishing feature" as the "prohibition of interest", they will then

proceed to report the interest rate that Islamic instruments pay. For instance, Reuters' 13 August 2002, coverage of Bahrain's $800 million sukuk ... followed their characterization of Islamic financial products as "interest-free" with a report that those sukuk will pay "4 percent annual profit".

He also complains that despite claims that sukuk—unlike conventional bonds—share the risk of their underlying asset and may increase or decrease in value, in sukuk such as the Tabreed sukuk mentioned above, steady payment of "rent" is written into the sukuk contract, giving them a risk structure "essentially" the same as conventional bonds.

Another observer, Salman Ali, found that many sukuk structures "do not conform to the Shariah". According to Ali, while most sukuk make an effort to remain "within Shariah bounds", they "replicate conventional debt instruments". They often combine more than one contract, "which individually may be Shariah-compliant", but when combined "may defeat the objective of the shariah". Furthermore, the sukuk rate of return is often "tied" to the Libor (London interbank offered rate) or Euribor (euro interbank offered rate) interest rate "rather than to the underlying business" that the sukuk is financing. This makes the sukuk "so similar to conventional debt instruments that it is difficult to tell one from the other". Ali believes this may be why rating agencies such as Standard & Poors and Moody's apply the same methodology for rating sukuk as for conventional debt instruments.

In 2011, Safari conducted various statistical and econometrics tests to check the argument that sukuk securities are merely the same as conventional bonds. However, his results on the comparison of yield to maturity of sukuk and that of conventional bonds show that sukuk securities are different from conventional bonds. In response to this argument, it was pointed out that yield to maturity reflects the interplay of supply and demand which may be affected by a financial product's packaging and target market rather than just the substance of the product alone. In 2011 Goldman Sachs abandoned a $2 billion sukuk programme it had registered with the Irish Stock Exchange, after some analysts stated that its sukuk "might violate Islamic bans on interest payments and monetary speculation" (in 2014 it successfully drew about $1.5 billion in orders for the five-year sukuk).

== Countries using sukuk ==
=== Bahrain ===
Bahrain is a major issuer of sukuk.

=== Bangladesh ===
In August 2020, Bangladesh Bank took initiatives to implement sukuk with the help of national private Islamic banks.

=== Brunei ===
Starting in 2006 the government of Brunei began to issue short-term sukuk al-ijarah securities. As of 2017 it has issued B$9.605 billion worth.

=== Egypt ===
On 8 May 2013, Egyptian President Muhammad Morsi approved a law allowing the government to issue sukuk. However as of May 2013 the relevant regulations have not been specified and this law has been replaced by amending some new articles in the capital market law and its executive regulations. As of 2016 the Egyptian government stated it would use "innovative financial tools for the implementation of government projects", such as sukuk.

=== Gambia ===
In 2007, Gambia replaced Sudan as one of the ten countries issuing sukuk. It has one of the lowest amount of sukuk issuance, with $12.6 mil as of 2008.

=== Indonesia ===
According to islamicfinance.com, at the end of 2013 outstanding stock in Indonesia's sukuk market was US$12.3 billion, with growth driven by the government sector.

=== Iran ===
Although the first use of Islamic financial instruments in Iran goes back to 1994 with the issuance of musharakah sukuk by Tehran Municipality to finance Navab project, the enactment of Iran securities market law, and new instruments and financial institutions development law was done respectively in 2005 and 2010 to pave the way for the appliance of such instruments to develop financial system of the country. The first ijarah sukuk was issued in Iranian Capital Market in January 2011 for financing Mahan Air company with the value of 291,500 million Iranian rials.

=== Malaysia ===
More than half of sukuk issued worldwide are denominated in Malaysian ringgit, with the United States dollar coming second. Malaysia is one of the few countries that makes it mandatory for sukuk and other debt papers to be rated. RAM Rating Services Bhd CEO Foo Su Yin says the total issuance of sukuk corporate bonds in 2012 was RM 71.7 billion while conventional bonds totalled RM48.3 billion. As at 2011, Malaysia was the highest global sukuk issuer by issuing 69 percent of world's total issuances.

=== Kazakhstan ===
In June 2012, Kazakhstan finalized its debut sukuk which will be issued by the Development Bank of Kazakhstan (DBK) in the Malaysian market. The DBK, which is 100% owned by the government of Kazakhstan, is working with HSBC and Royal Bank of Scotland (RBS) to manage the ringgit-denominated issuance, which is effectively a quasi-sovereign offering. The issuance will be listed on the Kazakhstan Stock Exchange, which has developed the infrastructure to list Islamic financial products such as ijarah, musharaka sukuk and investment funds.

=== Kyrgyzstan ===
Kyrgyzstan introduced sukuk into its securities law in 2016, but the first sukuk (a privately placed mudarabah sukuk) was only issued in 2023, followed by a number of issues of sukuk al-wakalah bi al-istithmar, an investment agency certificate. Kyrgyzstan’s government set a goal to make the Kyrgyz Republic an Islamic finance hub.

=== Pakistan ===
Pakistan issued a sukuk of $1 billion to fund a trade deficit with a yield of 5%.

=== Philippines ===
The Securities and Exchange Commission has issued guidelines regarding the issuance, registration and disclosure of sukuk through SEC Memorandum Circular No. 12 in early 2026. The Philippine government made its first sukuk bonds sale in December 2023, raising ₱1 billion.

=== Qatar ===
Qatar authorities and government related companies are looking into funding for its infrastructure projects by issuing Sukuk. In 2011 Qatar issued 11 percent of global sukuk.

=== Saudi Arabia ===
Saudi Aramco, a Saudi Arabian national petroleum and natural gas company, issued its first ever sukuk on 6 April 2017. Raising approximately 11.25bn riyals ($3bn), the move was prompted by low oil prices.

Later in the same month, the Saudi government raised US$9 billion in sukuk. Half were five-year sukuk with 100 basis point swap spread and the other half had a ten-year tenor with 140 basis point spread. In September 2017, the government sold further domestic sukuk worth 7 billion riyals (US$1.9 billion) and another 4.77 billion riyals (US$1.27 billion) were sold in December. These combined five-year sukuks priced at 2.75%, seven-year ones at 3.25%, and a ten-year tranche at 3.45%.

=== Singapore ===
In 2009, Singapore became the first non-Muslim majority country to issue a sovereign sukuk. Called the MAS Sukuk domestically, it is issued via a wholly owned subsidiary of the Monetary Authority of Singapore—Singapore Sukuk Pte Ltd. The Singapore MAS Sukuk is treated similarly to conventional Singapore Government Securities ("SGS") in aspects such as compliance with liquidity requirements.

Since then there have been several sukuk issuances in Singapore by local and foreign issuers. Singapore City Development Limited issued the first Singaporean ijarah sukuk in 2009, and Khazanah Shd Bhd issued a SGD1.5 billion sukuk in 2010 to finance its acquisition of parkway holdings. In 2013, there were 2 new sukuk programmes arranged for Singapore listed companies Swiber Holdings and Vallianz Holdings, with the former issuing a SGD150 million 5-year sukuk in Aug 2013.

=== Somalia ===
The Somali Stock Exchange (SSE) is the national bourse of Somalia. In August 2012, the SSE signed a Memorandum of Understanding to assist it in technical development. The agreement includes identifying appropriate expertise and support. Sharia compliant sukuk bonds and halal equities are also envisioned as part of the deal as the nascent stock market develops.

=== Turkey ===
Turkey issued its debut sukuk in October 2012. The October 2012 issuance was a double issuance, with one being in US dollars (issued on 10 October 2012 for $1.5B), and one being in Turkish lira (issued on 2 October 2012 for 1.62LRY). According to data from Sukuk.com, the US dollars issuance was oversubscribed and was initially planned to be for $1 billion, but because of strong demand from the Middle East it was increased to $1.5 billion.

Turkey returned to the sukuk market in October 2013 with a $1.25B issuance.

=== United Arab Emirates ===
As of January 2015, NASDAQ Dubai has listed 18 sukuk valued at a total $24 billion. The latest of these is Flydubai. The UAE has also attracted Western investment in the form of GE, which sold a 5-year, $500 million sukuk in 2009, and investment banker Goldman Sachs, which became the first conventional U.S. bank to issue sukuk in 2014.

=== United Kingdom ===
On 25 June 2014, HM Treasury became the first country outside of the Islamic world to issue a sukuk. This £200 million issue was 11.5 times oversubscribed and was priced at the same level as the equivalent UK Gilts (UK government bonds) at 2.036% pa. The sukuk was linked to the rental income of UK government property.

=== Hong Kong ===
Hong Kong has issued two sovereign sukuk as of the middle of 2015. It issued its first sukuk, a 5-year $1 billion ijarah sukuk, in September 2014, offering a profit rate of 2.005%. It issued its second sovereign sukuk in June 2015, also for $1 billion, with a 5-year maturity which used an innovative wakala structure offering a profit rate of 1.894%.

== See also ==
- Islamic banking and financing
- Murabaha
- Profit and loss sharing
- Gemach
