= Mu'amalat =

Part of Islamic jurisprudence

Muamalat (also muʿāmalāt, Arabic: معاملات, literally "transactions" or "dealings") is a part of Islamic jurisprudence, or fiqh. Muamalat has been defined as Islamic "rulings governing commercial transactions", (Note: (by Islamic Banking and Finance Institute of Malaysia and Majallah al-Ahkam al-Adliyyah),) (Note: IBFIM and Majallah al-Ahkam al-Adliyyah divide fiqh into: Fiqh Ibadat (worship), Fiqh Munakahat (Islamic family law), Fiqh Jinayat (Islamic criminal law) (or Uqubat), Fiqh Muamalat (Islamic commercial transaction law).; In his introduction to Islamic Law, Wael B. Hallaq does not use the term Muamalat, but also writes of Islamic law being divided into "four major fields" or "quarters", one of which is "sales". It includes not only laws on buying and selling but also on "partnerships, guaranty, gifts and bequests". "Generally, Muslim jurists gave the main topics of law the title kitab (“book”), e.g., the Book of Agency, which, in our modern organizational scheme, we recognize as a chapter. A sub-chapter was termed “bab,” which would in turn be broken into a number of fasls (sections). Many jurists conceived of the whole of Islamic law as falling into four major fields, which were called “the four quarters,” i.e., “rituals, sales, marriage and injuries.” Each of these terms, used in this context metaphorically, stands for a staggering variety of subjects that belong to a single quarter. Thus, the “quarter of sales” would encompass, among many other subjects, partnerships, guaranty, gifts and bequests, while that of “marriage” would cover as varied a field as dissolution of matrimony, foster relationships, custody, and wifely and family support. In the same vein, the “quarter of injuries” includes homicide, the Quranic punishments and the laws of war and peace, among other topics. Works generally ended with what we term procedural law, supplemented by coverage of slave manumission. Other works ended instead with inheritance and bequests.") but also more broadly to include civil acts and in general all aspects of fiqh that are not Ibadat, i.e. not acts of ritual worship such as prayer or fasting, (Note: (by Oxford Islamic Studies Online, Brian Kettell, and Wahbah al-Zuhayli’)) (Note: see also JALIL, et al., FOUR INTRODUCTORY THEORIES OF FIQH MUAMALAT, p.8) (See organizational chart of the structure of Islam below in "Principles" section.)

Mu'amalat provides much of the basis for Islamic economics, and the instruments of Islamic financing, and deals not only with Islamic legality but also social and economic repercussions and the rationale of its prohibitions (according to Monzer Kahf). Even a broad definition of Muamalat does not deal with all aspects of property and money in Islam, as zakat — compulsory alms giving that is one of the five pillars of Islam — is part of Ibadat division of fiqh.

== Definitions ==
- commercial and civil acts or dealings under Islamic law, (Oxford Islamic Studies Online);
- what involves acts of interaction and exchange of sureties and sales (Oxford Dictionary of Islam);
- “the knowledge of Shariah rulings that relates to the practical aspects of a mukallaf (an accountable Muslim, i.e. an adult and mentally competent) in the area of business and financial dealings and derived from its detailed evidences.” (Abdullaah Jalil, Asharaf Mohd Ramli, Syahidawati Shahwan. Based on the definition of fiqh established by the founder of the Shafi'i school of fiqh, Al-Shafi‘i (204 AH))
- all engagements that take place in business, ("corporate sharia elite" according to Patricia Sloane-White);
- Islamic jurisprudence of transactions, and the principles upon which Islamic finance is based (M.R. Ab`Aziz); also the study of "the legal framework within which economic transactions are conducted in an Islamic society" and that "determines their contracts" (Monzer Kahf);
- that aspect of Islamic jurisprudence that deals with civil obligations, (Jamal J. Nasir);
- "any form of mutual dealings held between men to solve their everyday needs, especially in matters relating to trade and commerce"; also "a social relationship which consists of various economic and non-economic activities." (Takaful Basic Examination of Islamic Banking and Finance Institute of Malaysia).

According to at least one author (Monzer Kahf), Mu'amalat "sets terms and conditions of conduct for economic and financial relationships in the Islamic economy" and provides the "grounds on which new instruments" of Islamic financing are developed. It also extends beyond discussions of Islamic legality "to the social and economic repercussions of alternative legal forms of economic or financial relationship and analyze the rationale behinds [sic] it."

== Principles ==
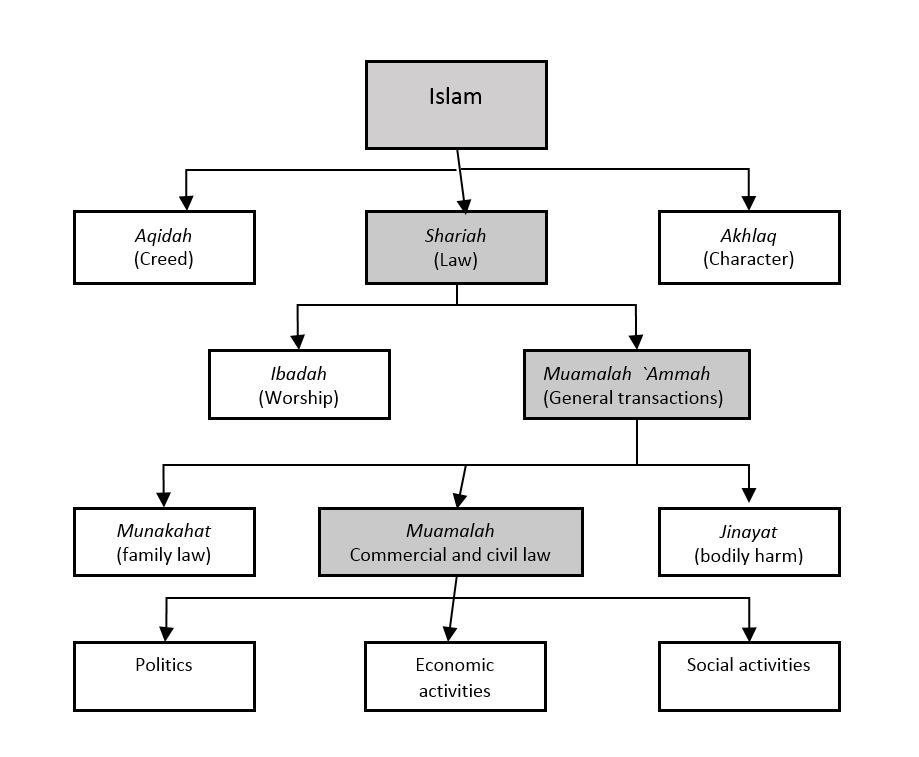
Aspects of Islam including fiqh

According to Hosein Askar, Zamir Iqbal, and Abbas Mirakhor, a "significant subset" of muamalat "defines the conduct of economic activities" within the economic system, which "ultimately lays down the rules for commercial, financial and banking system."

=== Basic principles ===
According to Aznan Hasan, basic principles of muamalat, are that dealings and contracts in Islam ...

- are permissible until evidence is given proving otherwise;
- must be based on mutual consent;
- must be in accordance with the maqasid (goals of) al shariah;
- should facilitate the circulation of wealth and property;
- should be transparent;
- must observe justice and fair dealing.

=== Theories of Muamalat ===
According to Abdullaah Jalil, Asharaf Mohd Ramli, Syahidawati Shahwan there are four "theories" that underlie the framework of Mu'amalat dealings:

1. Ahliyyah (Legal Capacity). Legal capacity refers to whether the person is of sound mind and old enough (puberty) to enter into a legal financial contract.
2. Mal (Property) concerns the nature and types of property that the contract deal with.
  1. Property must exist at the time of transaction
  2. seller must be owner of the merchandise
  3. merchandise must be Islamically lawful
  4. must be of some use or value
  5. must be able to be delivered by the seller to the buyer
  6. the details of the merchandise must be known to both the seller and buyer
3. Milkiyyah (Ownership), concerns the types, methods and scopes of ownership, that affect the relationship between the property and its owner in Islamic jurisprudence.
4. 'Aqd (Contract), describes the framework or structure of a contract in fiqh.

Authors Jalil, Ramli and Shahwan also list differences between Mu'amalat and 'Ibadat."

Some differences between Mu'amalat and 'Ibadat fiqh
Mu'amalat	al-'Ibadat
The primary ruling of fiqh is permissibility except where the Shariah prohibits an action.	The primary ruling is impermissibility except where the Shariah gives permission.
Specific Quranic and Sunnah resources to base ruling on are few and general in nature; hence the rational thinking can be applied extensively.	Specific Quranic and Sunnah resources to base ruling on are many and detailed in nature; hence it cannot be developed extensively by rationalization.
Actions are permitted except where the Shariah states prohibition.	Actions are not permitted except where the Shariah states permission.
Fatwa or verdict in based on the most appropriate (al-aysar) opinion	Fatwa or verdict is based on the most cautious (al-ahwat) opinion.
Legal rulings are heavily based on rational reasoning ('illah 'aqliyyah)	Legal rulings cannot be heavily based on rational reasoning (it is a submissive action - ta'abbudi).

=== General Prohibitions ===
According to muamalat, contracts ...

- should not involve the selling or buying of alcohol or any other haram substances.
- should not include any financial deal on the basis of usury (riba)
- should not involve gambling (maisir)
- should not involve major uncertainty (gharar fahish) (minor uncertainty is permissible).

=== Contracts ===
At least one source (a scholar identified as "Barbarti") defines aqad (contract) as a “legal relationship created by the conjunction of two declarations, from which flow legal consequences with regard to the subject matter”.

The essential elements of a contract are contracting parties (aqidan'), a subject matter ('Ma'aqud Alaih), and a legally binding offer and acceptance (sighah). They may be written, verbal or even indicated by signs (in the case of speechless person).

Muamalat contracts are prominent in Islamic banking where they are "fundamental factors" that determine whether a "transaction is valid or not".

Some contracts in Mu'amalat include:

- Sale Contract;
- Cost plus profit (murabahah);
- Debt (al-Qard);
- Hiring/leasing (al-Ijarah);
- Lending (al-I'arah);
- Agency (wakalah);
- Mortgage (al-Rahn);
- Partnership (Musharakah);
- Profit Sharing (Mudarabah).
