= Profit and loss sharing =

Islamic banking method

Profit and Loss Sharing (also called PLS or participatory banking) refers to Sharia-compliant forms of equity financing such as mudarabah and musharakah. These mechanisms comply with the religious prohibition on interest on loans that most Muslims subscribe to. Mudarabah (مضاربة) refers to "trustee finance" or passive partnership contract, while Musharakah (مشاركة or مشركة) refers to equity participation contract. Other sources include sukuk (also called "Islamic bonds") and direct equity investment (such as purchase of common shares of stock) as types of PLS.

The profits and losses shared in PLS are those of a business enterprise or person which/who has obtained capital from the Islamic bank/financial institution (the terms "debt", "borrow", "loan" and "lender" are not used). As financing is repaid, the provider of capital collects some agreed upon percentage of the profits (or deducts if there are losses) along with the principal of the financing. (Note: The money originally invested or loaned, on which basis interest and returns are calculated. The term loan is not used in profit and loss sharing) Unlike a conventional bank, there is no fixed rate of interest collected along with the principal of the loan. Also unlike conventional banking, the PLS bank acts as a capital partner (in the mudarabah form of PLS) serving as an intermediary between the depositor on one side and the entrepreneur/borrower on the other. The intention is to promote "the concept of participation in a transaction backed by real assets, utilizing the funds at risk on a profit-and-loss-sharing basis".

Profit and loss sharing is one of two categories of Islamic financing, the other being debt like instruments such as murabaha, istisna'a (a type of forward contract), salam and leasing, which involve the purchase and hire of assets and services on a fixed-return basis. While early promoters of Islamic banking (such as Mohammad Najatuallah Siddiqui) hoped PLS would be the primary mode of Islamic finance, use of fixed return financing now far exceeds that of PLS in the Islamic financing industry.

== Concepts ==
The premise underlying PLS is the concept of shirkah (similar to joint venture) in which the partners share in the profit and loss based on their ownership. This premise may be realized through mudarabah, musharaka, or a contract combining both concepts. One of the pioneers of Islamic banking, Mohammad Najatuallah Siddiqui, suggested a two-tier model as the basis of a riba-free banking, with mudarabah being the primary mode, supplemented by a number of fixed-return models – mark-up (murabaha), leasing (ijara), cash advances for the purchase of agricultural produce (salam) and cash advances for the manufacture of assets (istisna'), etc. In practice, the fixed-return models – in particular murabaha model – have become the bank's favourites, as long-term financing with profit-and-loss-sharing mechanisms has turned out to be more risky and costly than the long term or medium-term lending of the conventional banks.

=== Mudarabah ===
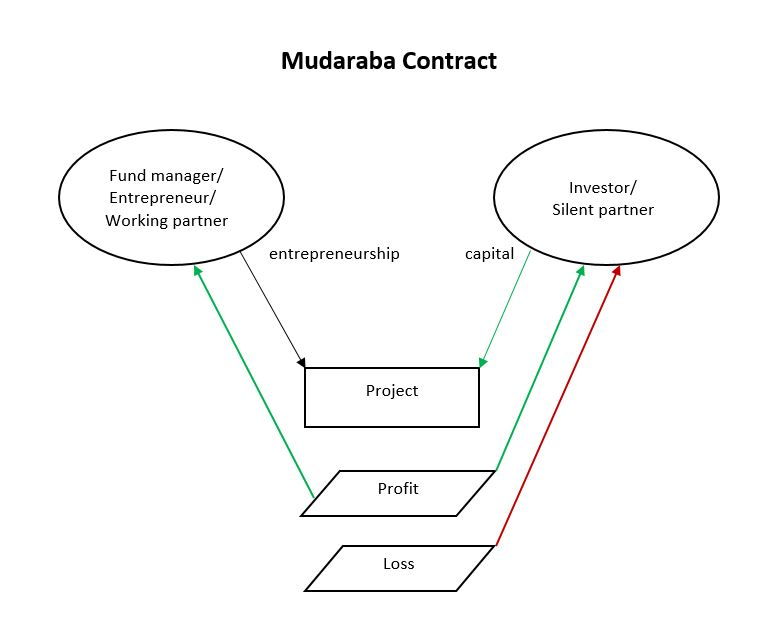
Structure of simple mudaraba contract

islamic finance

Mudarabah is a partnership where one party provides the capital while the other provides labor and both share in the profits. The party providing the capital is called the rabb-ul-mal ("silent partner", "financier"), and the party providing labor is called the mudarib ("working partner"). In classical mudaraba, the financier provides 100% of the capital; cases where the capital is provided by both the financier and the working partner result in a joint mudarabah-musharakah contract. Profits generated are shared between the parties according to a pre-agreed ratio. If there is a loss, rabb-ul-mal will lose his capital, and the mudarib party will lose the time and effort invested in the project. The profit is usually shared 50%-50% or 60%-40% for rabb ul mal-mudarib.

Further, Mudaraba is venture capital funding of an entrepreneur who provides labor while financing is provided by the bank so that both profit and risk are shared. Such participatory arrangements between capital and labor reflect the Islamic view that the borrower must not bear all the risk/cost of a failure, resulting in a balanced distribution of income and not allowing the lender to monopolize the economy.

Muslims believe that the Islamic prophet Muhammad's wife Khadija used a Mudaraba contract with Muhammad in Muhammad's trading expeditions in northern Arabia – Khadija providing the capital and Muhammad providing the labour/entrepreneurship.

Mudaraba contracts are used in inter-bank lending. The borrowing and lending banks negotiate the PLS ratio and contracts may be as short as overnight and as long as one year.

Mudarabah contracts may be restricted or unrestricted.

- In an al-mudarabah al-muqayyadah (restricted mudarabah), the rabb-ul-mal may specify a particular business for the mudarib, in which case he shall invest the money in that particular business only. For the account holder, a restricted mudarabah may authorize the IIFS (institutions offering Islamic financial services) to invest their funds based on mudarabah or agency contracts with certain restrictions as to where, how, and for what purpose these are to be invested. For the bank customer they would be held in "Investment Funds" rather than "Investment Accounts".
- In a al-mudarabah al-mutlaqah (unrestricted mudarabah), the rabb-ul-mal allows the mudarib to undertake whatever business he wishes and so authorizes him to invest the money in any business he deems fit. For the account holder funds are invested without any restrictions based on mudarabah or wakalah (agency) contracts, and the institution may commingle the investors funds with their own funds and invest them in a pooled portfolio, going to "Investment Accounts" rather than "Investment Funds".

They may also be first tier or two tier.

- Most mudarabah contracts are first tier or simple contracts where the depositor/customer deals with the bank and not with entrepreneur using the invested funds.
- In two-tier mudarabah the bank serves as an intermediary between the depositor and the entrepreneur being provided financing. Two tier is used when the bank does not have the capacity to serve as the investor or expertise to serve as the fund manager.

A variation of two-tier mudarabah that has caused some complaint is one that replaces profit and loss sharing between depositor and bank with profit sharing – the losses being all the problem of the depositors. Instead of both the bank and its depositors being the owners of the capital (rabb al-mal), and the entrepreneur the mudarib, the bank and the entrepreneur are now both mudarib, and if there are any losses after meeting the overhead and operational expenses, they are passed on to depositors. One critic (Ibrahim Warde) has dubbed this 'Islamic moral hazard' in which the banks are able 'to privatise the profits and socialize the losses'.

Another critic (M.A. Khan), has questioned the mudarabah's underlying rationale of fairness to the mudarib. Rather than fixed interest lending being unfair to the entrepreneur/borrower, Khan asks if it is not unfair to the rabb al-mal (provider of finance) to "get a return only if the results of investment are profitable", since by providing funds they have done their part to make the investment possible, while the actions of entrepreneur/borrower – their inspiration, competence, diligence, probity, etc. – have much more power over whether and by how much the investment is profitable or a failure.

=== Musharakah ===
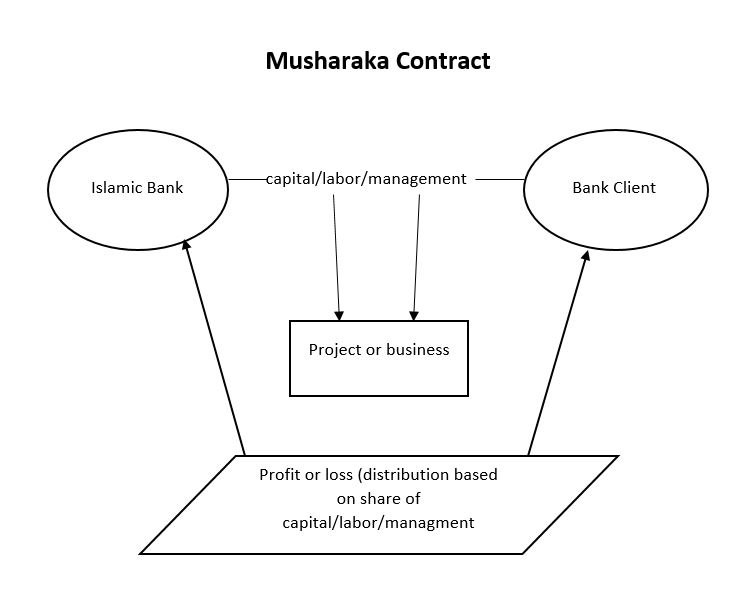
Structure of simple musharaka contract

Musharakah is a joint enterprise in which all the partners share the profit or loss of the joint venture. The two (or more) parties that contribute capital to a business divide the net profit and loss on a pro rata basis. Some scholarly definitions of it include: "Agreement for association on the condition that the capital and its benefit be common between two or more persons", (Mecelle) "An agreement between two or more persons to carry out a particular business with the view of sharing profits by joint investment" (Ibn Arfa), "A contract between two persons who launch a business of financial enterprise to make profit" (Muhammad Akram Khan).

Musharakah is often used in investment projects, letters of credit, and the purchase or real estate or property. In the case of real estate or property, the bank assesses an imputed rent and will share it as agreed in advance. All providers of capital are entitled to participate in management, but not necessarily required to do so. The profit is distributed among the partners in pre-agreed ratios, while the loss is borne by each partner strictly in proportion to respective capital contributions. This concept is distinct from fixed-income investing (i.e. issuance of loans).

Musharaka is used in business transactions and often to finance a major purchase. Islamic banks lend their money to companies by issuing floating rate interest loans, where the floating rate is pegged to the company's rate of return and serves as the bank's profit on the loan. Once the principal amount of the loan is repaid, the contract is concluded

- Shirka al'Inan is a Musharaka partnership where the partners are only the agent but do not serve as guarantors of the other partner.
  - Different shareholders have different rights and are entitled to different profit shares.
  - Al'Inan is limited a specific undertaking and is more common than Al Mufawada.
- Mufawada is an "unlimited, unrestricted, and equal partnership".
  - All participants rank equally in every respect (initial contributions, privileges, and final profits)
  - Partners are both agents and guarantors of other partners.

Other sources distinguish between Shirkat al Aqd (contractual partnership) and Shirkat al Milk (co-ownership), although they disagree over whether they are forms of "diminishing musharaka" or not.

==== Permanent Musharaka ====
Investor/partners receive a share of profit on a pro-rata basis.

- The period of contract is not specified and the partnership continues for as long as the parties concerned agree for it to continue.
- A suitable structure for financing long term projects needing long term financing.

==== Diminishing partnership ====
Musharaka can be either a "consecutive partnership" or "declining balance partnership" (otherwise known as a "diminishing partnership" or "diminishing musharaka").

- In a "consecutive partnership" the partners keep the same level of share in the partnership until the end of the joint venture, unless they withdraw or transfer their shares all together. It's used when a bank invests in "a project, a joint venture, or business activity", but usually in home financing, where the shares of the home are transferred to the customer buying the home.
- In a "diminishing partnership" (Musharaka al-Mutanaqisa, also "Diminishing Musharaka") one partner's share diminishes as the other's gradually acquires it until that partner owns the entire share. This mechanism is used to finance a bank customer's purchase, usually (or often) of real estate where the share diminishing is that of the bank, and the partner acquiring 100% is the customer. The partnership starts with a purchase, the customer "starts renting or using the asset and shares profit with (or pays monthly rent to) its partner (the bank) according to an agreed ratio."

If default occurs, both the bank and the borrower receive a proportion of the proceeds from the sale of the property based on each party's current equity. Banks using this partnership (as of 2012) including the American Finance House, and Dubai Islamic Bank.

Diminishing Partnership is particularly popular way of structuring an Islamic mortgage for financing homes/real estate and resembles a residential mortgage. The Islamic financier buys the house on behalf of the other "partner", the ultimate buyer who then pays the financier monthly installments combining the amounts for

1. rent (or lease payments) and
2. buyout payment

until payment is complete. Thus, a diminishing Musharaka partnership actually consists of a musharakah partnership contract and two other Islamic contracts – usually ijarah (leasing by the bank of its share of the asset to the customer) and bay’ (gradual sales of the bank's share to the customer).

In theory, a diminishing Musharaka for home purchase differs from a conventional mortgage in that it charges not interest on a loan, but 'rent' (or lease payment) based on comparable homes in the area. But as one critic (M.A. El-Gamal) complained, some

"ostensibly Islamic Banks do not even make a pretense of attempting to disguise the role of market interest rates in a 'diminishing musharaka', and ... the 'rental' rate is directly derived from conventional interest rates and not from any imputed 'fair market rent'".

El-Gamal gives as an example the Islamic Bank of Britain's explanation that its 'rental rates' are benchmarked to commercial interest rate "such as Libor (London Interbank Offered [interest] Rate) plus a further profit margin", rather than being derived from the prevailing rental levels of equivalent units in the neighborhood. The Meezan Bank of Pakistan is careful to use the term "profit rate" but it is based on KIBOR (Karachi Interbank Offered [interest] Rate).

According to Takao Moriguchi, musharakah mutanaqisa is fairly common in Malaysia, but questions about its shariah compliance mean it is "not so prevailing in Gulf Cooperation Council (GCC) countries such as Saudi Arabia, Kuwait, the United Arab Emirates, Qatar, Bahrain, and Oman".

=== Differences ===
A mudarabah arrangement differs from the musharakah in several ways:

Differences between Mudarabah and Musharakah
Concept	Mudarabah	Musharakah
Investment	Comes solely from the "financier" (rabb-ul-maal) not the "working partner"	Comes from all partners
Ownership	All goods purchased during the venture belong to the "financier" not the "working partner"	Owned jointly by all partners in proportion of their investment
Loss	Is borne solely by the "financier". The loss of the "working partner" loss is limited to the time spent on the venture. However, the "working partner" is liable for losses due to misconduct (e.g. theft), negligence, or breach of the contract's terms.	Borne by all partners in accordance with the ratio of investment/ownership
Profit	Profits are usually split based on a pre-agreed upon ratio between the "financier" and "working partner".	Most scholars opine that profits must be distributed among partners in accordance with ratio of investment/ownership.

== Promises and challenges ==
Profit and loss sharing has been called "the main justification" for, or even "the very purpose" of the Islamic finance and banking movement" and the "basic and foremost characteristic of Islamic financing".

One proponent, Taqi Usmani, envisioned it transforming economies by

- rewarding "honest, honorable and forthright behaviour";
- protecting savers by eliminating the possibility of collapse for individual banks and for banking systems;
- replacing the "stresses" of business and economic cycles with a "steady flow of money into investments";
- ensuring "stable money" which would encourage "people to take a longer view" in looking at return on investment;
- enabling "nations and individuals" to "regain their dignity" as they become free of the "enslavement of debt".

Usmani considers profit and loss sharing the "ideal" Islamic financial instrument and superior to Islamic debt-based financing (such as credit sales). Usmani notes that some non-Muslim economists (Note: James Robertson and John Tomlinson. In his short book, Transforming Economic Life (Schumacher Briefings), James Robertson suggests several highly unorthodox ideas such as introducing multiple competing currencies (multinational, national, local, and community currencies) for consumers to use; banning banks from fractional-reserve banking and replacing the money credit "creates" with the issuing of "new money" "directly" by governments as a "component of Citizen's income"; and "as a goal for the long term ... limit[ing] the role of interest [in finance] more drastically ... by converting debt to equity") have supported development of equity markets in "areas of finance currently served by debt" (though they do not support banning interest on loans).

=== Lack of use ===
While it was originally envisioned (at least in mudarabah form), as "the basis of a riba-free banking", with fixed-return financial models only filling in as supplements, it is those fixed-return products whose assets-under-management now far exceed those in profit-loss-sharing modes.

One study from 2000-2006 (by Khan M. Mansoor and M. Ishaq Bhatti) found PLS financing in the "leading Islamic banks" had declined to only 6.34% of total financing, down from 17.34% in 1994-6. "Debt-based contracts" or "debt-like instruments" (murabaha, ijara, salam and istisna) were far more popular in the sample. Another source (Suliman Hamdan Albalawi, publishing in 2006) found that PLS techniques were no longer "a core principle of Islamic banking" in Saudi Arabia and Egypt. In Malaysia, another study found the share of musharaka financing declined from 1.4% in 2000 to 0.2% in 2006.

In his book, An Introduction to Islamic Finance, Usmani bemoans the fact that there are no "visible efforts" to reverse this direction of Islamic banking,

The fact, however, remains that the Islamic banks should have advanced towards musharakah in gradual phases .... Unfortunately, the Islamic banks have overlooked this basic requirement of Islamic banking and there are no visible efforts to progress towards this transaction even in a gradual manner, even on a selective basis.

This "mass-scale adoption" of fixed-return modes of finance by Islamic financial institutions has been criticized by shariah scholars and pioneers of Islamic finance like Mohammad Najatuallah Siddiqui, Mohammad Umer Chapra, Taqi Usmani and Khurshid Ahmad who have "argued vehemently that moving away from musharaka and mudaraba would simply defeat the very purpose of the Islamic finance movement".

(At least one scholar – M.S. Khattab – has questioned the basis in Islamic law for the two-tier mudarabah system, saying there are no instances where the mudharib passed funds onto another mudharib. (Note: Khattab writes, "fuqaha are in agreement that a mudarib is not entitled to forward mudarabah money to a third party for business".)

=== Explanations for lack ===
Critics have in turn criticized PLS advocates for remaining "oblivious to the fact" that the reason PLS has not been widely adopted "lies in its inefficiency" (Muhammad Akram Khan), and their "consequence-insensitive" way of thinking, assuming that "ample supply" of PLS "instruments will create their own demand" (Nawab Haider Naqvi), consumer disinterest notwithstanding. Faleel Jamaldeen describes the decline in the use of PLS as a natural growing process, where profit and loss sharing was replaced by other contracts because PLS modes "were no longer sufficient to meet industry demands for project financing, home financing, liquidity management and other products".

Moral Hazard

On the liability side, Feisal Khan argues there is a "long established consensus" that debt finance is superior to equity investment (PLS being equity investment) because of the "information asymmetry" between the financier/investor and borrower/entrepreneur – the financier/investor needing to accurately determine the credit-worthiness of the borrower/entrepreneur seeking credit/investment, (the borrower/entrepreneur having no such burden). Determining credit-worthiness is both time-consuming and expensive, and debt contracts with substantial collateral minimize its risk of not having information or enough of it. In the words of Al-Azhar rector Muhammad Sayyid Tantawy, "Silent partnerships [mudarabah] follow the conditions stipulated by the partners. We now live in a time of great dishonesty, and if we do not specify a fixed profit for the investor, his partner will devour his wealth."

The bank's client has a strong incentive to report less profit to the bank than it has actually earned, as it will lose a fraction of that to the bank. As the client knows more about its business, its accounting, its flow of income, etc., than the bank, the business has an informational advantage over the bank determining levels of profit. (For example, one way a bank can under report its earnings is by depreciating assets at a higher level than actual wear and tear.) Banks can attempt to compensate with monitoring, spot-checks, reviewing important decisions of the partner business, but this requires "additional staff and technical resources" that competing conventional banks are not burdened with.

Higher levels of corruption and a larger unofficial/underground economy where revenues are not reported, indicate poorer and harder-to-find credit information for financiers/investors. There are several indicators this is a problem in Muslim majority countries (such as the presence of most Muslim-majority countries in the lower half of the Transparency International Corruption Perceptions Index and the "widespread tax evasion in both the formal and informal sectors" of Middle East and North Africa, according to A.R. Jalali-Naini.) But even in the more developed United States, the market for venture capital (where the financier take a direct equity stake in ventures they are financing, like PLS) varies from around $30 billion (2011–12) to $60 billion (2004) compared to "several trillion dollar" market for corporate financing.

Taqi Usmani states that the problems of PLS would be eliminating by banning interest and requiring all banks to be run on a "pure Islamic pattern with careful support from the Central Bank and government." The danger of dishonesty by borrowers/clients would be solved by

1. requiring every company/corporation to use a credit rating;
2. implementing a "well designed" system of auditing.

Other explanations

Other explanations have been offered (and rebutted) as to why use of PLS instruments has declined to almost negligible proportions:

- Most Islamic bankers started their careers at conventional banks so they suffer from a "hangover", still thinking of banks "as liquidity/credit providers rather than investment vehicles".
  - But by 2017 Islamic banking had been in existence for over four decades and "many if not most" Islamic bankers had "served their entire careers" in Islamic financial institutions.
- In some countries, interest is accepted as a business expenditure and given tax exemption, but profit is taxed as income. The clients of the business who obtain funds on a PLS basis must bear a financial burden, in terms of higher taxes, that they would not if they obtained the funds on an interest or fixed debt contract basis;
  - However as of 2015, this is no longer the case in "most jurisdictions", according to Faisal Khan. In the UK, for example, whose the government has hoped to make an IBF hub, "double taxation of Islamic mortgages for both individuals and corporations" has been removed, and there is "favorable tax treatment of Islamic debt issuance".
- Islamic products have to be approved by banking regulators who deal with the conventional financial world and so must be identical in function to conventional financial products.
  - But banks in countries whose governments favor Islamic banking over conventional – i.e. Malaysia, Pakistan, Sudan, Iran – show no more inclination towards Profit and Loss sharing than those in other countries. Nor have regulations of financial institutions in these countries diverged in form from those of other "conventional" countries

When it comes to the manner in which Islamic securities are offered, the process and rules for such offerings, even in those jurisdictions with special licensing regimes, are, in effect, the same. (For example, the rules governing the listings of Islamic bonds issued by the Securities and Commodities Authority of the United Arab Emirates are almost identical to the rules governing the listing of conventional bonds save for the use of [sic] word 'profit' instead of 'interest'.

- According to economist Tarik M. Yousef, long-term financing with profit-and-loss-sharing mechanisms is "far riskier and costlier" than the long term or medium-term lending of the conventional banks.
- Islamic financial institutions seek to avoid the "risk of exposure to indeterminate loss".
- In conventional banking, the banks are able to put all their assets to use and optimize their earnings by borrowing and investing for any length of time including short periods such as a day or so. The rate of interest can be calculated for any period of time. However, the length of time it takes to determine a profit or loss may not be nearly as flexible, and banks may not be able to use PLS for short term investment.
- On the other side of the ledger, their customers/borrowers/clients do not like to give away any "sovereignty in decision making" by taking the bank as a partner which generally means opening their books to the bank and the possibility of bank intervention in day-to-day business matters.
- Because customers/borrowers/clients can share losses with banks in a PLS financing, they (the clients) have less financial incentive to avoid losses of risky projects and inefficiency than they would with conventional or debt-based lending.
- Competing fixed-return models, in particular the murabaha model, provides "results most similar to the interest-based finance models" depositors and borrowers are familiar with.
- Regarding the rate of profit and loss sharing – i.e. the "agreed upon percentage of the profits (or deduction of losses)" the Islamic bank takes from the client – there is no market to set it or government regulation of it. This leaves open the possibility the bank could exploit the client with excessive rates.
- PLS is also not suitable or feasible for non-profit projects that need working capital, (in fields like education and health care), since they earn no profit to share.
- The property rights in most Muslim countries have not been properly defined. This makes the practice of profit-loss sharing difficult;
- Islamic banks must compete with conventional banks which are firmly established and have centuries of experience. Islamic banks that are still developing their policies and practices, and feel restrained in taking unforeseen risks;
- Secondary markets for Islamic financial products based on PLS are smaller;
- One of the forms of PLS, mudaraba, provides only limited control rights to shareholders of the bank, and thus denies shareholders a consistent and complementary control system.
- The difficulty in expanding a business financed through mudaraba because of limited opportunities to reinvest retained earnings and/or raise additional funds.
- The difficulty for the customer/borrower/client/entrepreneur to become the sole owner of a project financed through PLS, except through diminishing musharaka, which may take a long time.
- Also the structure of Islamic bank deposits is not sufficiently long-term, and so investors shy away from getting involved in long-term projects.
- The sharia calls for helping the poor and vulnerable groups such as orphans, widows, pensioners. Insofar as these groups have any capital, they will seek to preserve it and generate sources of steady, reliable income. While conventional interest-bearing savings accounts provide such conservative investments, PLS do not.

== Industry ==
=== Sudan ===
Between 1998 and 2002 musharkaka made up 29.8% of financing in Sudan and mudaraba 4.6%, thanks in at least part to pressure from the Islamic government. Critics complain that the banking industry in that country was not following the spirit of Islamic banking spirit as investment was directed in the banks' "major shareholder and the members of the board(s) of directors".

=== Kuwait ===
In Kuwait the Kuwait Finance House is the second largest bank and was exempt from some banking regulations such that it could invest in property and rims outright and participate directly in musharaka financing of corporations and "generally act more like a holding company than a bank". Nonetheless as of 2010 78.4% of its assets were in murabahah, ijara and other non-PLS sources.

=== Pakistan ===
The Islamic Republic of Pakistan officially promotes Islamic banking – for example by (starting in 2002) prohibiting the startup of conventional non-Islamic banks. Among its Islamic banking programmes is establishing "musharaka pools" for Islamic banks using its export refinance scheme. Instead of lending money to banks at a rate of 6.5% for them to lend to exporting firms at 8% (as it does for conventional banks), it uses a musharaka pool where instead of being charged 8%, firms seeking export credit are "charged the financing banks average profit rate based on the rate earned on financing offered to ten 'blue-chip' bank corporate clients". However, critic Feisal Khan complains, despite "rigamarole" of detailed instructions for setting up the pool and profit rate, in the end the rate is capped by the State Bank at "the rate declared by the State under its Export finance scheme".

Another use of musharaka in Pakistan is by one of the largest Islamic banks (Meezan Bank) which has attempted to remedy a major problem of Islamic banking – namely providing lines of credit for the working needs of client firms. This it does with a (putative) musharaka "Islamic running finance facility". Since the workhorses of Islamic finance are product-based vehicles such as murabaha, which expire once the product has been financed, they do not provide steady funding – a line of credit – for firms to draw on. The Islamic running finance facility does. The bank contributes its investment to the firm as a partner by covering the "firms net (negative) position at the end of the day". "Profit is accrued to the bank daily on its net contribution using the Karachi Interbank Offered Rate plus a bank-set margin as the pricing basis". However according to critic Feisal Khan, this is an Islamic partnership in name only and no different than a "conventional line of credit on a daily product basis".

=== Islamic Development Bank ===
Between 1976 and 2004, only about 9% of the financial transactions of the Islamic Development Bank (IDB) were in PLS, increasing to 11.3% in 2006-7. This is despite the fact that the IDB is not a multilateral development agency, nor a for-profit, commercial bank. (While the surplus funds placed in other banks are supposed to be restricted to Shariah-compliant purposes, proof of this compliance was left to the affirmation of the borrowers of the funds and not to any auditing.)

=== United States ===
In the United States the Islamic banking industry occupies a much smaller share of the banking industry than in Muslim majority countries, but is involved in 'diminishing musharaka' to finance home purchases (along with Murabaha and Ijara). As in other countries the rent portion of the musharaka is based on the prevailing mortgage interest rate rather than the prevailing rental rate. One journalist (Patrick O. Healy 2005) found costs for this financing are "much higher" than conventional ones because of higher closing costs. Referring to the higher costs of Islamic finance, one banker (David Loundy) quotes an unnamed mortgage broker as stating, "The price for getting into heaven is about 50 basis points".

== See also ==
- Islamic banking and finance
- Muamalat
- Murabaha
- Islamic finance products, services and contracts
- Sharia and securities trading
- Riba
