= Takaful =

Islamic form of insurance

Takaful (Arabic: التكافل, sometimes translated as "solidarity" or mutual guarantee) is a co-operative system of reimbursement or repayment in case of loss, organized as an Islamic or sharia-compliant alternative to conventional insurance, which contains riba (usury) and gharar (excessive uncertainty).

Under takaful, people and companies concerned about hazards make regular contributions ("donations") to be reimbursed or repaid to members in the event of loss, and managed on their behalf by a takaful operator. Like other Islamic finance products, Takaful is grounded in Islamic Muamalat (commercial and civil acts or dealings branch of Islamic law).

In 2018, the takaful industry had grown to a size of $27.7 billion of "contributions" (from a 2011 figure of $12 billion). The movement has been praised as providing "superior alternatives" to insurance that "reinvigorate human capital, emphasize personal dignity, community self-help, and economic self-development"; but also criticized as having "dwindled" in scope to an industry of "conventional insurance with Arabic terminology and language of contract".

== Principles ==
Theoretically, takaful is perceived as cooperative or mutual insurance, where members contribute a certain sum of money to a common pool. The purpose of this system is not profits, but to uphold the principle of "bear ye one another's burden". The principles of takaful are as follows:

- Policyholders cooperate among themselves for their common good.
- Policyholders' contributions are considered as donations to the fund (pool).
- Every policyholder pays his subscription to help those who need assistance.
- Losses are divided and liabilities spread according to the community pooling system.
- Uncertainty is eliminated concerning subscription and compensation.
- It does not derive advantage at the cost of others.

Muslims scholar have "hardly any difference of opinion" on "the need for managing, redeeming and mitigating general, business and life risks covered by the insurance business". But whether conventional insurance is forbidden (haram) is disputed.

=== Fiqh scholars ===
In its second session (December 1985), the Fiqh Academy of the Organisation of Islamic Cooperation (also called the International Islamic Fiqh Academy) ruled conventional commercial (but not social) insurance haram (forbidden). Its ninth resolution stated:

The commercial insurance contract, with a fixed insurance premium, as practiced by commercial insurance companies, contains substantial gharar, which renders the contract defective. Consequently, it is legally forbidden.

=== Argument against conventional insurance ===
Islamic scholars began forbidding commercial insurance as early as the late nineteenth century CE. The majority of Islamic scholars believe commercial insurance is disallowed for Muslims because it contains

- Al-Gharar (uncertainty)
- Al-Maisir (gambling)
- Riba (usury)

They have two main concerns about conventional insurance:

1. The uncertainty "if and when the insured event will take place and, if it does take place, what would be the relationship of compensation to the insurance premium paid". (What if the holder of collision insurance policy never has a motor vehicle accident? they lose and the insurance company wins. Regarding life insurance, everyone dies, but what if the death occurs after the first payment of a premium for life insurance? they win and the insurance company loses.) This "makes the insurance business similar to gambling, where the gambler does not know the fate of the game". Thus, uncertainty in the conventional insurance business "is excessive and borders on prohibited gharar".
2. "Insurance companies invest surplus funds on the basis of interest and pay out a part of such earnings to policyholders as bonuses." According to the 'orthodox interpretation', this is riba.

According to Jamal Zarabozo, the majority of modern Muslim such as scholars from Islamic Fiqh Council of the Organisation of Islamic Cooperation, the Board of the Leading Scholars of Saudi Arabia, the Fiqh Council of Mecca under the auspices of Muslim World League, Siddiq ad-Dharir, Wahbah al-Zuhayli, Muhammad Mustafa as-Sinqithi, Salaah al-Saawi, Abdullah al-Muslih, Sulaiman Thunayaan, Ali Abu al-Basl, Abdur Rawf al-Shaadhili, Faisal Maulawi, Mohammad Muslehuddin, Afzalur Rahman, and numerous other respected scholars and jurists agreed that commercial insurance were forbidden.

=== Defense of conventional insurance ===
A minority of Islamic scholars argue that insurance is not like gambling because in gambling, no risk is covered and no damage is mitigated. The gamblers play a game of chance for entertainment and profit in which they can win or lose, based on a conscious decision. Insurance provides coverage for events out of the insured policyholder's control. When the policyholder collects a payout, they are not a winner, but a loser who at least has some compensation. Furthermore, while insurance involves uncertainty, "statistical techniques and actuarial sciences have progressed to a stage where the insurance company can calculate its risks and benefits with great precision," so that the uncertainty involved in insurance can scarcely be called excessive in normal circumstances.

=== Scriptural basis ===
Islamic scholars supporting takaful point to Qur'an ^{[Quran 5:2]} (Note: ISLAMIC INSURANCE THEORY and PRACTICE states: `All legal evidence permits Cooperative Insurance, as God says in the Holy Quran, "Cooperate for good and pious deeds and do not cooperate to do evil and aggression."` But does not specifically cite ^{[Quran 5:2]}. Shakir translates part of ^{[Quran 5:2]} as "and help one another in goodness and piety, and do not help one another in sin and aggression;") and several sayings (hadith) of the Islam prophet Muhammad. Some examples are:

Qur'an

Basis of Co-operation: Help one another in al-Birr and in al-Taqwa (both: virtue, righteousness and piety), but do not help one another in sin and transgression. (Sūrat al-Māʼidah, Verse 2)^{[Quran 5:2]}

Hadith

- God will always help his servant for as long as he helps others. (Narratives by Imam Ahmad ibn Hanbal and Imam Abu Daud.)
- Basis of Responsibility: The place of relationships and feelings of people with faith, between each other, is just like the body; when one of its parts is afflicted with pain, then the rest of the body will be affected. (Narratives by Imam al-Bukhari and Imam Muslim)
- One true Muslim (Mu’min) and another true Muslim are like a building, whereby every part in it strengthens the other part. (Narratives by Imam al-Bukhari and Imam Muslim)
- Basis of Mutual Protection: By my life (which is in God's power), nobody will enter Paradise if he does not protect his neighbour who is in distress. (Narrative of Imam Ahmad bin Hanbal.)

The fundamentals underlying takaful are very similar to co-operative and mutual principles, to the extent that the co-operative and mutual model is one that is accepted under Islamic law.

== History & models ==
The concept of takaful has reportedly been practised in various forms since 622 CE. The first practitioner of Takaful were known as Zubayr ibn al-Awwam, companion of the prophet, as this practice were allowed according to classical scholar consensus, such as Ibn Taymiyyah in his Majmu Fatawa. In practice, Takaful were regarded as technically as zero interests banking with fundraising business model. In the eyes of scholars and researchers, al-Zubair Entrepreneurship of Tafakul has become serious object of study by scholars of Islamic institutions regarding the conduct and ethics in business in accordance of Islamic Fiqh, such as Dr Erwandi Tarmizi. Additionally, Modern researchers of Islamic banking, and Islamic financing theorists, has delved the business aspect of Zubayr during his lifetime as rolemodel. One of the principles of az-Zubayr business were the ethics of Fundraising based business according to Sharia. This type of fundraising business consisted of Zubayr practice of accepting safety deposits as a loan and investing the money, without accepting interest as profit of the business, which regarded as usury in Islam teaching.

According to Ali Ahmad Salih, professor of Middle East University in Jordan, this fundraising Takaful business of Zubayr ibn al-Awwam were centered in Medina with its branches spread in Alexandria, Kufa and Basra. Ali Ahmad Salih pointed out the evidences based on the records of Hisham ibn Urwah narration in Tabaqat al Kubra which written by Ibn Sa'd.

During Abbasid Caliphate era, such Islamic banking system were apparent. there were even one business center named Dar-uz Zubayr in Basra that accept any deposits. Zafarul Islam theorized in his Academic journal released by Aligarh Muslim University, that the deposit center were named after Zubayr ibn al-Awwam. Meanwhile, modern day Pakistani Islamic business theorist, Zubair Mughal, has further observed the model of Zubayr ibn al-Awwam practice of Tafakul to avoid the Gharar (risky business), gambling, and Riba, which all forbidden by Islamic law.

=== Modern era ===
Muslim jurists acknowledge that the basis of shared responsibility (in the system of aquila as practised between the Muslims of Mecca and Medina) laid the foundation of mutual insurance. "In the case of insurance, as with commercial banks, orthodox opinion prevailed," and with "a consensus among Muslim scholars" about the legitimacy of takaful and the illegitimacy of conventional insurance, the "movement for Islamizing the contemporary insurance business" started around the mid-1970s. In 1976, a fatwa was issued by the Higher Council of Saudi Arabia "in favor of an Islamic model" of insurance. The International Islamic Fiqh Academy, Jeddah of the Organisation of Islamic Cooperation also approved takaful as a legitimate form of business in 1985. The Islamic Insurance Company of Sudan started as the first takaful company in 1979. By the mid-1990s, there were seven takaful companies in Sudan, Dubai, Saudi Arabia, Bahrain and Jordan. Prominent contributors to the development of Takaful in Saudi Arabia include businessman Saleh Malaikah, known for his involvement in the sector through Rusd Holding Group.

The industry grew from $1.384 billion in 2004 to $5.318 billion in 2008. By the end of 2011, total takaful contributions amounted to $12 billion (as compared to $4 trillion for conventional insurance). In 2005, there were 82 companies around the world engaged in takaful business (77 dedicated takaful companies, and five "offering takaful products" from "Islamic windows"). By 2006, there were 133. As with the traditional forms of insurance, reinsurance of a takaful operation may be used, known as "retakaful". Also in 2006, AIG, a non-Muslim US-based company (with more than 88 million customers in 130 countries), established a takaful subsidiary called AIG Takaful Enaya, headquartered in Bahrain. As of 2013 the leading takaful countries are "Malaysia and the Gulf states". It was reported in 2016 that out of total 308 takaful companies, 93 are takaful windows; however, these takaful windows own only 2.5% of the total takaful assets.

In 2024, the UK Government announced plans to introduce an Alternative Student Finance (ASF) system based on Takaful principles, offering interest-free funding for higher education to students whose religious beliefs prohibit the use of conventional loans.

=== Models ===
There are several models (and several variations) of how takaful can be implemented:

- Mudharabah model (profit-sharing): the managers (shareholders) are sharing profit and losses with the policyholders; used initially in Far East.
- Tabarru'-based: "donations" (Tabarru'), i.e. premiums, are accumulated into a fund to meet members' losses. Members are not allowed to take back any contributions or profits from investments.
- A combination of Tabarru' and Mudharabah: Bahrain, UAE and Middle East countries.
- Wakala model: agency fee, received up front from the contributors and transferred to shareholders fund.
- Al Waqf-based model: Waqf is a distinct entity and a legal person. According to one critic, "except for names and terms, the essence" of both Al Waqf takaful and conventional insurance is the same, and as a consequence this structure "has come under a lot of criticism from Shari'ah scholars". Mainly used in Pakistan and South Africa.

=== The Mudharabah model (profit-sharing) ===
According to this principle the al-Mudharib (takaful operator) accepts payment of the takaful installments or takaful contributions (premiums, known as ra's-ul-mal) from investors or providers of capital or funds (takaful participants), acting as sahib-ul-mal. The contract specifies how the profits (or surplus) from the operations of the takaful is to be shared in accordance with the principle of al-mudharabah between the participants (as providers of capital) and the takaful operator. The sharing of such profit may be in a ratio of 50:50, 60:40, 70:30 and so forth, as mutually agreed between the contracting parties.

In order to eliminate the element of uncertainty in the takaful contract, the concept of tabarru' ("to donate, contribute, or give away") is incorporated. Relating to this concept, a participant agrees to relinquish (as tabarru') a certain proportion of his takaful installments (or contributions) that he agrees or undertakes to pay, should any of his fellow participants suffer a defined loss. This agreement enables him to fulfill his obligation of mutual help and joint guarantee.

In essence, tabarru' enables participants to perform their deeds in assisting fellow participants who might suffer a loss or damage due to a catastrophe or disaster. The sharing of profit (or surplus) that may emerge from the operations of a takaful is made only after the obligation of assisting the fellow participants has been fulfilled. It is imperative, therefore, for a takaful operator to maintain adequate assets of the defined funds under its care whilst striving prudently to ensure the funds are sufficiently protected against over-exposure. Therefore, the provision of insurance coverage is in conformity with Shariah based on the Islamic principles of al-takaful and al-mudharabah.

Al-mudharabah is the commercial profit-sharing contract between the provider or providers of funds for a business venture and the entrepreneur who actually conducts the business. The operation of a takaful may thus be envisaged as the profit-sharing business venture between the takaful operator and the individual members of a group of participants who desire to reciprocally guarantee each other against a certain loss or damage that may be inflicted upon any one of them.

== Criticism ==
One complaint made against (most) takaful (by Muhammad Akram Khan) is that despite the talk of solidarity, (most) takaful-holders "do not have any 'voice'" in the management of the takaful. The "TO (takaful operator) makes all the crucial decisions, such as rate of premium, risk strategy, asset management and allocation of surpluses and profits". The shareholders of the TO, and "not the takaful-holders, appoint and dismiss managers of the takaful". Similarly, Mahmud El-Gamal complains that "even companies that use the term takaful ta'āwun (cooperative mutual guarantee or insurance) are structured with stockholder rather than policyholder ownership", despite the 9/2 ruling of the International Islamic Fiqh Academy that permitted insurance as "cooperative insurance, built on the principles of voluntary contribution (tabarru') and mutual cooperation". An exception to this state of affairs can be found in Sudan, where the takaful-holders have more say in the management of the takaful business.

Whether takaful is significantly different from conventional insurance has been questioned. Islamic economist Mohammad Najatuallah Siddiqui writes that:

"The form of organization chosen to take advantage of the law of large numbers does not change the reality. We can make insurance a not-for-profit activity (provided we can ensure efficient management), but it does not change the essential nature of what is being done."

According to Rakaan Kayali, the fact that benefits for the takaful members are distributed as funds allow, rather than defined by the policy, may lead to conflict among members—if, for example, one member's claim uses up takaful funds so that another member with an equally valid claim a short time later is not compensated, or not compensated in full.

Additionally, there has been doubt cast on the legitimacy of claiming that takaful participants are making "donations". This is because the word "donations" implies giving with no expectation of worldly return. This is clearly not the case with takaful participants who are seeking insurance.

== Sources ==
Chakib Abouzaid: Presentation of the World Islamic Insurance Directory at the World Takaful Conference (2006/07/08/09/10/11/12) www.takaful-re.ae
