= Gharar =

Uncertainty, hazard, chance or risk in Arabic

Gharar (Arabic: غرر) literally means uncertainty, hazard, chance or risk. It is a negative element in mu'amalat fiqh (transactional Islamic jurisprudence), like riba (usury) and maisir (gambling). One Islamic dictionary (A Concise Dictionary of Islamic Terms) describes it as "the sale of what is not present" — such as fish not yet caught, crops not yet harvested. Similarly, author Muhammad Ayub says that "in the legal terminology of jurists", gharar is "the sale of a thing which is not present at hand, or the sale of a thing whose aqibah (consequence) is not known, or a sale involving hazard in which one does not know whether it will come to be or not".

== Definitions, fiqh ==
According to Sami Al-Suwailem, "researchers in Islamic finance" do not agree on the "precise meaning" of gharar, although there is not necessarily great difference among the Islamic schools of jurisprudence (madhab) in the term's definition.

The Hanafi legal school defines gharar as "that whose consequences are hidden", (according to Sami Al-Suwailem). According to Md Akther Uddin, scholars of Hanafi school of fiqh (Islamic jurisprudence) have defined gharar as "something which its consequence is undetermined." Sarakhsi, an Islamic scholar of the Hanafi school, described gharar as "anything that the end result is hidden or the risk is equally uncommon, whether it exists or not."

Similarly, the Shafi legal school defined gharar (according to Sami al-Suwailem) as "that whose nature and consequences are hidden" or "that which admits two possibilities, with the less desirable one being more likely." Scholars of Shafi’i fiqh have described it as “something which in its manner and its consequence is hidden."

The Hanbali school defined it as "that whose consequences are unknown" or "that which is undeliverable, whether it exists or not." Ibn Hazm of the Zahiri school of jurisprudence wrote "Gharar is where the buyer does not know what he bought, or the seller does not know what he sold."

To the Islamic scholar Al-Qarafi, gharar is "that which has a pleasant appearance and a hated essence".

Among modern scholars of Islam, Mustafa Al-Zarqa has written that "Gharar is the sale of probable items whose existence or characteristics are not certain, due to the risky nature that makes the trade similar to gambling." Sami al-Suwailem, has used Game Theory to try and reach a more exact, measurable definition of Gharar, defining it as "a zero-sum game with unequal payoffs".

== Scripture ==
While the word gharar is not specifically mentioned in the Quran, two verses (2:188; 4:29) are thought to refer to it.

There are "numerous hadiths" forbidding gharar sales according to the Academy for International Modern Studies. In one, Ahmad and Ibn Majah narrated on the authority of Abu-Said al-Khudriy that:

The Prophet (pbuh) has forbidden the purchase of the unborn animal in the mother's womb, the sale of the milk in the udder without measurement, the purchase of spoils of war prior to their distribution, the purchase of charities prior to their receipt, and the purchase of the catch of a diver.

== Varieties ==
In Islamic economics and finance, jurists have tried to sort out different aspects of gharar to determine whether a given financial transaction is "shariah-compliant" or not when gharar is present. Because some amount of gharar is "always present in all contracts and conducts", Islamic scholars (at least in recent years) generally divide gharar into two types:

- Gharar fahish ("excess" gharar) (also gharar-e-kathir, "too much" gharar) is prohibited (haram) and discussed in ahadith
- Gharar yasir ("light" gharar) (also gharar qalil, "nominal" gharar) refers to small or trivial amounts of gharar which are tolerated (halal).

=== When not prohibited ===
Four conditions where gharar is not invalidated are:

- in the aforementioned gharar yasir;
- where the contract is "unilateral or charitable" (al tabarru'at) so that the other party to the contract is not exploited, such as a gift or bequest;
- where there is a "public need for the transaction or contract" (maslahah, for example in the Islamic finance instruments of bay' al salam and istisna`);
- where risk (ghurm) "inherent in productive economic activities".

While both gharar and riba (Usury) are negative elements in Islamic economics, there is much less material available about gharar in the literature of Islamic economics and finance than there is on riba, and "gharar is considered to be of less significance than Riba." According to Muhammad Ayub, "a consensus" among Islamic scholars has emerged in the recent past "regarding its extent rendering any transaction valid or void". While the slightest involvement of Riba makes a transaction non-Shariah-compliant, some degree of Gharar" is acceptable.

=== Insurance and Takaful ===
Orthodox Islamic scholars argue that commercial insurance (as opposed to social or cooperative insurance) contains gharar and is haram (forbidden). In its place takaful or cooperative insurance "built on principles of voluntary contribution and mutual cooperation" has been proposed.

=== Khatar ===
Khatar (خطر) is a kind of gharar that occurs when the "liability of any of the parties to a commutative contract is, or becomes, uncertain or contingent on some unforeseen/uncontrollable event", according to the Islamic Investment and Finance website.

== See also ==
- Maisir
- Sharia and securities trading
