= Maisir =

Islamic views on gambling

In Islam, Maisir (Arabic: ميسر, romanized: maisîr, maysir, maisira or قمار qimâr) refers to gambling. Maisir is considered haram, or explicitly and totally prohibited by Islamic law (Sharia). Maisir is prohibited on the grounds that:

the agreement between participants is based on immoral inducement provided by entirely wishful hopes in the participants' minds that they will gain by mere chance, with no consideration for the possibility of loss.

Quranic verses that address Maysir include Surah Al-Baqarah 2:219, which describes both benefits and great sin associated with intoxicants and gambling, while stating that their sin is greater than their benefit.

Surah Al-Ma'idah 5:90 explicitly instructs believers to avoid intoxicants and gambling, describing them as works of Satan. The following verse, 5:91, states that intoxicants and gambling can create hostility and hatred and hinder the remembrance of God and prayer.

== Etymology ==
Both qimar and maisir refer to games of chance, but qimar is a kind—or subset—of maisir. Author Muhammad Ayub defines maisir as:

...wishing something valuable with ease and without paying an equivalent compensation for it or without working for it, or without undertaking any liability against it by way of a game of chance,

Another source—Faleel Jamaldeen—defines it as "the acquisition of wealth by chance (not by effort)". Ayub defines qimar as:

also mean[ing] receipt of money, benefit or usufruct at the cost of others, having entitlement to that money or benefit by resorting to chance;

Jamaldeen also refers to maisir as: "any game of chance".

== In scripture ==
It is stated in the Quran that games of chance which include money, including maisir, are a "grave sin" and "abominations of Satan's handiwork". It is also mentioned in the Hadith.

They ask you about wine and gambling. Say: 'In them both lies grave sin, though some benefit, to mankind. But their sin is more grave than their benefit.'

— Qur'an 2:219

O believers, wine and gambling, idols and divining arrows are an abhorrence, the work of Satan. So keep away from it, that you may prevail. Satan only desires to arouse discord and hatred among you with wine and gambling, and to deter you from the mention of God and from prayer. Will you desist?

— Qur'an 5:90-91

Narrated Abu Huraira: The Prophet said, "Whoever swears saying in his oath. 'By Al-lāt and al-‘Uzzá,' should say, 'None has the right to be worshipped but God; and whoever says to his friend, 'Come, let me gamble with you,' should give something in charity."

— Sahih Bukhari, Book 78 (Oaths and Vows), hadith 645

== See also ==
- Glossary of Islam
- Outline of Islam
- Khamr (Intoxicants)
- Sharia
  - Sharia and securities trading
