= Mohammad Nejatullah Siddiqi =

Indian economist (1931–2022)

- Born: 1931; Gorakhpur, United Provinces, British India
- Died: November 2022 (aged 91); California, United States
- Occupation(s): Islamic Economist and Islamic Finance Scholar
- Website: www.siddiqi.com/mns/

Mohammad Nejatullah Siddiqi (1931 – November 2022) was an Indian economist and the winner of the King Faisal International Prize for Islamic Studies.

Born in India in 1931, he was educated at Aligarh Muslim University as well as Rampur and Azamgarh. He served as associate professor of economics and professor of Islamic studies at the Aligarh Muslim University and as professor of economics at the King Abdul Aziz University, Jeddah, Saudi Arabia, in its Center for Research in Islamic Economics. He later became a Fellow at the Center for Near Eastern Studies at the University of California, Los Angeles, and after that a visiting scholar at the Islamic Research & Training Institute, Islamic Development Bank, Jeddah.

Siddiqi was a prolific writer in Urdu and English. According to WorldCat, he has 63 works in 177 publications in 5 languages and 1,301 library holdings. Several of his works have been translated into Arabic, Persian, Turkish, Indonesian, Malaysian, Thai, etc. Perhaps his most widely read book is Banking without interest which was published in 27 editions between 1973 and 2000 in 3 languages and is held by 220 libraries worldwide.

During his long academic career, he supervised a number of Ph.D. theses in the universities in India, Saudi Arabia and Nigeria.

He was associated with a number of academic journals as editor or advisor. He served on numerous committees and participated in many conferences in various parts of the world. He was very helpful for all and shared his valuable knowledge in the society. He lived in Aligarh, India. He was Professor Emeritus in the Department of Management Studies, Aligarh Muslim University, India. He served as the Chief Patron of the Indian Centre for Islamic Finance (ICIF), New Delhi.

Siddiqi died in California, USA in November 2022, at the age of 91.

== Works ==
=== In Urdu ===
Siddiqi wrote at least eleven books in Urdu, Including:

- G̲h̲air sūdī bank kārī. (1969)
- Islāmī adab : cand naẓaryātī maqālāt (1960?)
- Muslim Personal Law (1971),
- Taḥrīk-i Islāmī ʻaṣr-i ḥāz̤ir men̲, (Islamic Movement in Modern Times) (1995)
- Maqasid Al Shariah

=== Translation to Urdu ===
- Kitab al Kharaj by Abu Yusuf (1966).

=== In English ===
He wrote at least ten books in English. His work in English has been published in over 100 editions.His major works on Islamic banking have been written in English. Among them are :

- Recent Theories of Profit: A Critical Examination (1971);
- Economic Enterprise in Islam (1972);
- Muslim Economic Thinking (1981);
- Banking Without Interest (1983);
- Issues in Islamic banking : selected papers (1983) was widely reviewed;
- Partnership and profit-sharing in Islamic law (1985)
- Insurance in an Islamic Economy (1985);
- Teaching Economics in Islamic Perspective (1996);
- Role of State in Islamic Economy (1996)
- Dialogue in Islamic Economics (2002).
- Islam's View on Property (1969)

== Awards ==
- King Faisal International Prize for service to Islamic Studies (1982)
- Shah Waliullah Award in New Delhi for contributions to Islamic Economics (2003)
