= Contract law in Saudi Arabia =

Contract Law of Saudi Arabia

Legal System
- Wahhabi movement of Sharia Law, Sunni

Sources of Law
- Quran; Sunna; Ijma; Qiyas

Sharia Principles of Contract Law
- Riba; Gharar

World Bank Enforcing Contracts Data (2010)
- Enforcing Contracts Ranking: 140th out of 183 economies Average Number of Procedures: 43; Average Time Taken: 635 days Average Cost: 27.5% of claim, (20% attorney cost, 7.5% court cost)

Contract law in Saudi Arabia is governed by the conservative Wahhabi movement of Sharia law, which adopts a fundamentalist and literal interpretation of the Quran. Any contract that is not specifically prohibited under Sharia law is legally binding, with no discrimination against foreigners or non-Muslims.

The Wahhabis are the most liberal among the Sunnis with respect to the freedom of persons to contract. However, the degree of freedom of contract is governed by the prohibitions in the Quran, and two distinctive doctrines in Sharia law: riba (usury) and gharar (speculation).

Unlike other Sharia law jurisdictions, Sharia law remains uncodified in Saudi Arabia due to the strong literalist view of Wahhabism. There is also no established case reporting in the courts. This has led to much uncertainty and variation in court decisions. Despite being the world's 11th easiest economy to do business in, Saudi Arabia ranks 140th out of 183 economies in terms of enforcement of contracts. (see below: Appendix)

In 2007, King Abdullah initiated legal reforms to modernise the courts and codify Sharia law in Saudi Arabia. The ulama, the religious body, approved a codification of Sharia law in 2010, and a sourcebook of legal principles and precedents was published on January 3, 2018. (see below: Legal Reform)

== Sources of law in Saudi Arabia ==
Saudi Arabia is principally governed by Sharia Law, with royal decrees playing a complementary role.

=== Four sources of Sharia law ===
The Wahhabis acknowledges the following sources of law:

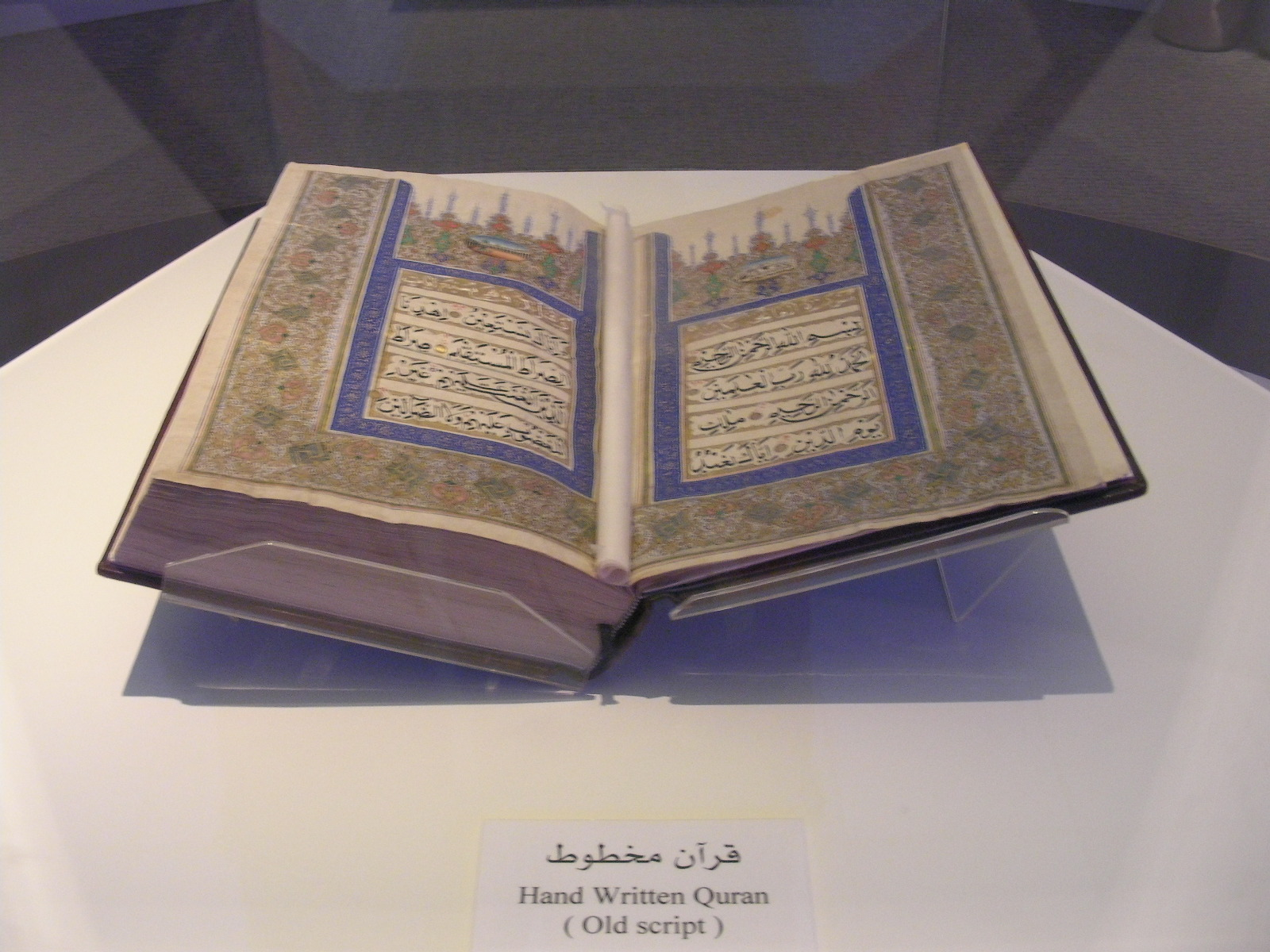
Hand written Quran in Saudi Arabia

1. The Quran is a sacred book which contains the divine revelations made to Muhammad by God and is the foundation for Sharia law. Much of the Quran does deal with legal matters, but instead, sets out the goals and aspirations of Muslims, and the general accepted conduct and way of living.
2. The Sunna (meaning "habitual practice" or "trodden path") is the other primary source of law. It contains the explanations of the Quran and records the sayings, deeds, and approved practices of Muhammad.
3. Ijma (consensus) is a secondary source of law. There are however, conflicting interpretations as to the meaning of consensus. The Wahhabis prevailing in Saudi Arabia asserts that a legally binding consensus only arises from agreement of Muhammad and his Companions, and not the universal agreement of Muslim authorities today.
4. Qiyas (reasoning by analogy) is another secondary source of law. Forms of analytical reasoning are categorised as law.

Both ijmas and qiyas constitute fiqh, Islamic jurisprudence based upon scholar opinions amassed over the years.

=== Regulations (lai'hah) and ordinances (nizma) ===
Ordinances (nizam), consisting of royal decrees which address modern legal issues and bureaucratic matters, is another source of law. These royal decrees by the King supplement fiqh. Royal decrees are considered subordinate to Sharia law as only religious law is considered "law" under Sharia law. The courts will apply fiqh over nizam if the legal issue is already considered in Sharia law, or if nizam conflicts with Sharia law.

Other forms of regulations (lai'hah) including Royal Orders, Council of Ministers Resolutions, Ministerial Resolutions and, Ministerial Circulars, are likewise subordinate to Sharia law. While contract law is generally governed under Sharia law, many areas of modern business and commercial activities are not considered under Sharia law and are hence governed by the applicable regulations.

Saudi Arabia also abides by international treaties, which are approved by royal decree. One such example is Royal Decree No.11, dated 16 Rajab 1414, corresponding to 30 December 1993, which declared Saudi Arabia's ascension to the New York Convention on the Recognition and Enforcement of Foreign Arbitral Awards.

== Formation of contract ==
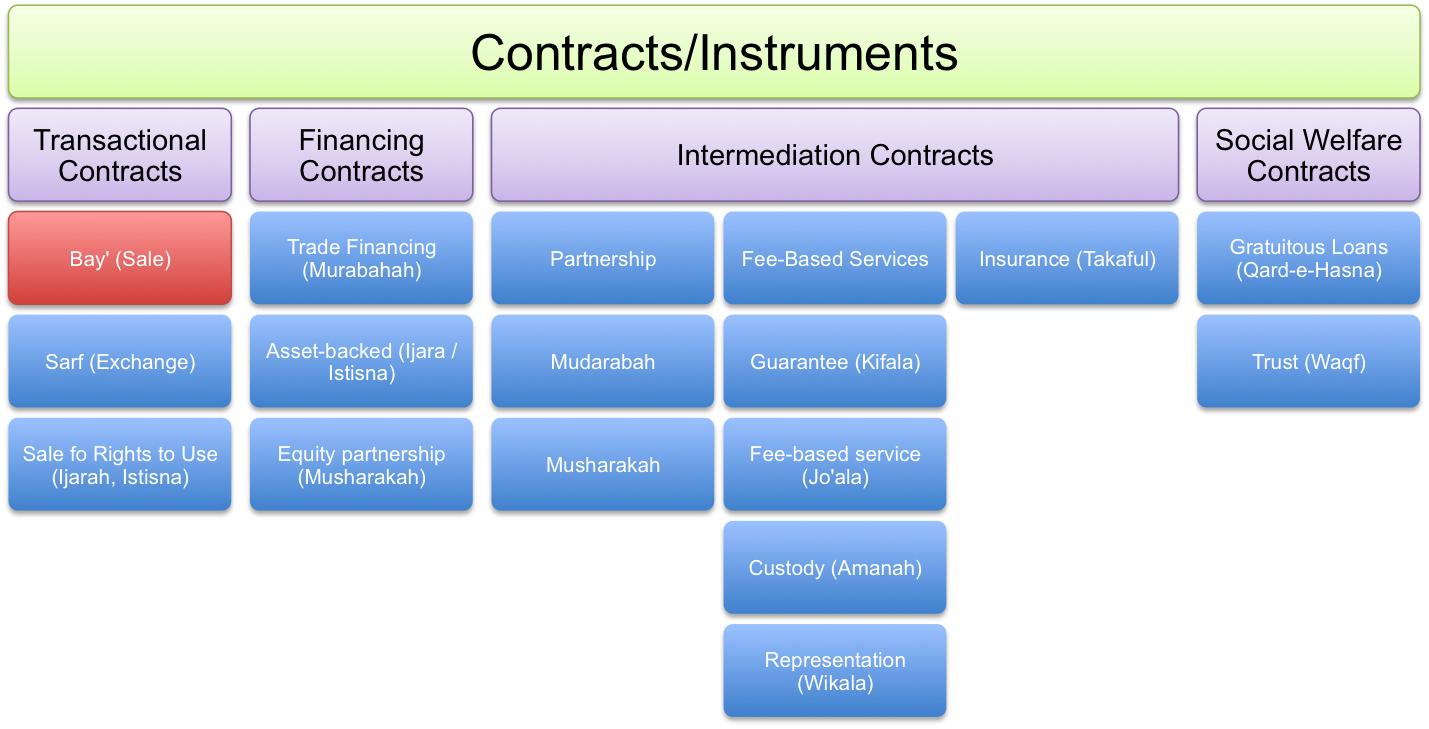
Types of contracts at sharia law.

A contract of sale (bay’) can be concluded for the exchange of anything regarded as a commodity or property (mal). However, there are certain things that are not included as mal under Sharia and therefore cannot be the subject of a sale. These include: pigs, alcohol, and animals not ritually slaughtered. In accordance to the Quran, there are two exceptions to contract formation: the taking of interest (riba), and the use of speculative contracts.

The rules on conclusion of the contract of sale are stricter than the rules in most modern legal systems. Conclusion of the contract must take place at the same transaction as offer and acceptance. Furthermore, there is a right of withdrawal of the offer even after acceptance.

At common law, auctions, advertisements, displays of goods on shelves, tenders and the like are treated as mere invitations to create an offer. In contrast, Sharia law recognises these as valid offers (Ijab) which, upon being accepted (Qabul), will become binding by law upon the parties involved in the transaction.

Generally, a statement with the description and price of goods constitutes an offer, and a display of goods with the price similarly is an offer. However, advertisers can specify that the advertisement is only an invitation to treat.

=== Offer and acceptance ===
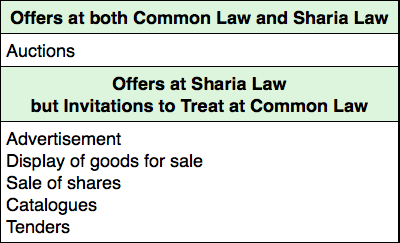
As opposed to common law, many commercial actions are offers at sharia law.

Like the common law, offer and acceptance are among the vital ingredients of a contract in Islamic law. An offer is a proposal, which leads to an agreement when there is an acceptance of the offer. If there is an acceptance, the offeror is bound by law to perform his promise. The offeror has no right to revoke his offer after its acceptance and he must be prepared to complete his promised accordingly.

A statement of an offer has to be made in the past tense (Sighatul-Madhi) to be constituted as a valid offer in Sharia law. Making the statement in past tense signifies the seller's intention of making a valid offer which is capable of being accepted by the buyer. Once the offer has been accepted, the seller has no right to revoke his offer. If he does revoke his offer, it will be considered a breach of promise on his behalf, which is a great sin in Islam as it encourages rivalry and mischief among the people.

Unlike common law, Saudi Arabian law requires acceptance to be made before the parties attempting to contract physically part.

Certain terms must also be stated for a Saudi Arabian contract to be enforceable. These include: the items involved, quantity, price, parties and how payment will be made.

=== Consideration ===
The concept of consideration implies the bargain, or value given in return for value received. Islamic law, unlike common law, does not require consideration. A contract in Saudi Arabia is a bond between the parties and God, hence, the element of consideration is deemed superfluous.

=== Defects of consent and vitiating factors ===
Similar to common law, defects of consent will prevent the formation of a valid agreement.

== Limitations on enforceability of contracts ==
Not all contractual arrangements are condoned in Sharia law. Unless a term is positively allowed by revelation ("in the book of God"), it is invalid.

Classical Sharia law rarely discusses the idea of contractual freedom outside the standard contract types. Instead, it provides for situation where standard contracts can be altered or combined. There are specific prohibitions raised by other hadiths, some important ones prohibiting a loan and a sale, two sales in one, and a sale of what one does not have.

Stipulations are divided into three types:

Condition (ta’liq)	conditioning of contract on a future event
Concomitance (iqtiran)	varying the terms of the contract
Extension (idafa)	delaying the beginning of a contract until a future time

If the court finds stipulation a void, the contract itself may or may not be void- results vary casuistically. In particular, concomitant stipulations that coincide with or contradict an entailment of the contract, such as a stipulation that a buyer must never resell the object, are forbidden.

Combinations of contracts conditioned on each other are open to many objections, because they confuse the price of the individual contracts and obstruct meting out fair remedies for breach, thereby opening a door to riba and gharar. There are two major types of contracts that are prohibited in Islamic law: contracts involving usury or uncertainty.

=== Usury (riba) ===
The Quran forbids riba in the strongest terms. Riba is an unjustified enrichment and the principle encompasses a total ban on the charging of interest.

Usurious transactions were classified into three classes:

ribaal-fadl	unlawful excess in exchange of counter values in a contemporaneous transaction
riba al-nasi'a	unlawful gain by deferring the completion of exchange of counter values
ribaal-jahilya	exemplified by the lender asking the borrower at maturity date if he will settle the debt or increase it by charging interest

Riba al-fadl and riba al-nasi'a apply to the exchange of two precious metals (gold or silver) and four commodities (wheat, barley, dates and salt), based on Muhammad's tradition. It was further extended by analogy to the products of these six articles if their present or future exchange could have the smell or taint of riba. Islamic law did not permit exchange of unequal values of these articles and by analogy to a variety of their products. These articles happened to be the basic necessities of life and were a convenient means of exploitation. Promises for future performance were forbidden if goods comprised these articles as the transactions were suspected to contain riba.

The interpretation of riba has continued to be revised under the changing economic setting. By the turn of the century, the leading Islamic scholars Abduh and Rida held the view that riba al-Jahilya was forbidden but it could be deemed lawful under extreme necessity, and that riba al-fadl and riba al nasi'a are under a rebuttable presumption of prohibition.

The ban against interest rates has been circumvented by both parties pretending that a greater amount was lent or that the difference between loan and debt is actually a commission rate.

=== Speculation (Gharar) ===
Gambling is another type of transaction condemned in the Quran.

Intoxicants, games of chance [maysir], [worship of] idols, and [divination by] arrows are but an abomination, Satan's handiwork...

The Sunna takes this prohibition much further; it not only condemns gambling but also sales of gharar (peril, risk or hazard).

The Messenger of God forbade the 'sale of the pebble' [hash, sale of an object chosen or determined by the throwing of a pebble] and the sale of gharar.

Besides this, other transactions that are conditioned on uncertain events are also prohibited. Lack of knowledge about the existence or nonexistence of the subject matter, or concerning its quality, quantity, or date of performance, was held to trigger gharar. The ongoing refinement of the doctrine has been narrowed down to the presence or absence of uncertainty about future performance and not to the existence or non-existence of the subject matter at the time of contract. If the nonexistent article or subject matter is certain to be delivered or performed at a future date the prohibition of gharar does not apply.

== Remedies for breach of contract ==
Rescission is allowed under specific circumstances, such as when the seller fails to perform; the merchandise is defective or the quantity incorrect; the quality of service inferior; or when unforeseen circumstances prevent the completion of the contract.

In accordance with Islamic law, remedies for contract are restricted to direct and actual damages. The courts will not recognize economic loss of chance, interest, potential profits and other speculative awards that normally might be given. Specific performance and injunctive relief are likewise generally unavailable.

Saudi Courts also preclude consequential damages based on anticipated profits. As such, contracts involving relationships over time such as continuous supply of goods will not attract full liability if wrongfully terminated. Courts would only award reparations for immediate damages.

Islamic law fixes the relationship of contracting parties to any object involved in the contract as to liability for loss or damage. A party holds the object either as a 'trustee' (amin) or as a 'guarantor' (damin). A trustee is not liable at all for injury to the object, unless shown to be in breach of trust. A damin, however, bears the same risk of loss as an owner. If an object is destroyed through an act of God or force majeure, the guarantor has no recourse.

== Procedures and prerequisites of contract enforcement ==
Enforcing of a contract consists of three main stages:

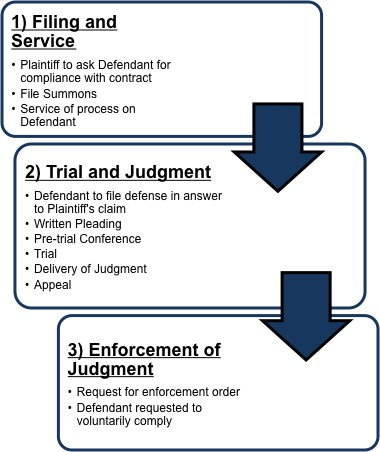
Procedure of Contract Enforcement

=== Filing and service ===
The plaintiff is to ask the defendant for compliance with the contract before filing his summons with the court. Before admitting a plaintiff's summons, a judge will examine it for formal requirements. The summons will be then delivered to a summoning officer for service of process on defendant.

=== Trial and judgment ===
The defendant files a written defense in answer to the plaintiff's claim. The judge will then set a deadline for the plaintiff to answer the defendant's answer with a written pleading. A pre-trial conference will be held where the judge will discuss procedural issues with the parties. At trial, merits of the case will be argued, and cross examination of witnesses, if any, will take place. After receiving the judgment, the plaintiff is to formally notify the defendant of the judgment. The defendant will then be given a choice to appeal before a certain deadline.

=== Enforcement ===
The plaintiff approaches a court enforcement office or private bailiff to request for an enforcement order. The defendant will be requested to voluntarily comply with the judgment. For contracted debt, the judge will call for a public auction for the property to be sold after the attachment of the defendant's movable goods. The proceeds of the public auction are distributed to various creditors according to rules of priority.

== Foreign law contracts ==
Foreign law contracts are generally enforceable so long as they conform to Sharia law. Thus contracts deemed to be usury or dealing with gambling or risk would not be enforceable. Courts and judicial committees in Saudi Arabia also do not recognise the doctrine of conflict of laws. Hence any action based on a foreign law contract can be submitted to the courts even if there are express choice of law provisions.

=== Enforcement of foreign judgments and arbitral awards ===
The Board of Grievances, a statutory tribunal separate from the Sharia courts, is empowered to hear requests for the enforcement of foreign judgments and arbitral awards. Article 6 of the Rules of Pleadings and Procedures of the Grievances Board provides that an applicant seeking to enforce foreign judgments or arbitral awards must prove that:

1. the judgment or award is not contrary to Sharia law or public policy; and
2. the applicant proves reciprocity of enforcement ie that a Saudi judgment or award would be accepted and enforced in the applicant's country.

Firstly, the judgment or award must not be contrary to Sharia law or public policy; it must not offend the Sharia principles of riba and gharar. Judgments or awards involving conventional insurance, speculative loss of chance, interest and potential profits would not be recognized.

The applicant must also show that a judgment or award by the Saudi Courts would be reciprocally enforced in the applicant's country. In the past, the Board has declined to accept a legal opinion by a foreign lawyer or a letter from the UK government stating that foreign judgments would generally be enforced in the UK. This second requirement applies in the absence of any bilateral or multilateral agreement relating to the reciprocal enforcement of decisions. Despite being a signatory to regional reciprocity agreements and an international convention on the enforcement of arbitral awards, the decision to enforce such foreign judgements or awards is subject to compliance with Sharia law and public policy.

== Legal reform ==
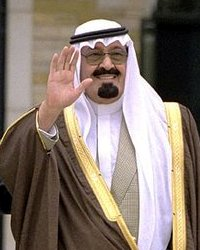
King Abdullah has sought to implement various legal reforms since his accession to the throne.

King Abdullah succeeded to the throne in 2005 and since then has implemented various reforms in Saudi Arabia with the aim of modernizing the legal system to improve investor confidence.

The King enacted the Law of Judiciary in 2007 to restructure the judicial system and proposed a codification of unwritten Sharia regulations and principles to ensure certainty and uniformity of judicial decisions. In 2009, the King removed the chairman of the Supreme Judicial Council as the ultraconservative cleric was impeding the king's proposed restructuring of the court system. The unseated cleric was also known to oppose codification of Sharia law.

In 2010, the top religious body in Saudi Arabia gave the green light for codification of Sharia law. Nonetheless, it has been commented that such legal reforms will take a considerable period of time to be fully implemented due to lack of well-trained judges and lawyers and the ulama's resistance to modernisation and change.

== Appendix ==
Ease of enforcing contracts among the world's top 15 "easiest to doing business" economies compared (2010 World Bank Data)

Economy	Ease of Doing Business Rank	Enforcing Contracts Rank	Procedures (number)	Time (days)	Cost (% of claim)
Singapore	1	13	21	150	25.8
Hong Kong	2	2	24	280	19.5
New Zealand	3	9	30	216	22.4
United Kingdom	4	23	28	339	23.4
United States	5	8	32	300	14.4
Denmark	6	30	35	410	23.3
Canada	7	58	36	570	23.3
Norway	8	4	33	280	9.9
(Republic of Ireland) Ireland	9	37	20	515	26.9
Australia	10	16	28	395	20.7
Saudi Arabia	11	140	43	635	27.5
(Georgia (country)) Georgia	12	41	36	285	29.9
Finland	13	11	32	375	13.3
Sweden	14	52	30	508	31.2
Iceland	15	3	27	417	8.2

== See also ==
- Basic Law of Saudi Arabia
- Hanafi
- Islamic schools and branches
- Maliki
- Saudi Arabia
- Shafi`i
- Sources of Islamic law
- Sunni
