= Riba =

Part of Islamic law

Riba (Arabic: ربا ,الربا، الربٰوة, ribā or al-ribā, IPA: [ˈrɪbæː]) is an Arabic word used in Islamic law and roughly translated as "usury": unjust, exploitative gains made in trade or business (especially banking). Riba is mentioned and condemned in several different verses in the Qur'an (3:130, 4:161, 30:39, and the commonly referenced 2:275-2:280). It is also mentioned in many hadith (reports of the life of Muhammad).

While Muslims agree that riba is prohibited, not all agree on its precise definition. The term is often used to refer to interest charged on loans, (Note: Feisal Khan notes that Abdullah Yusuf Ali translates riba as "usury" in his famous translation of the Quran, while the well-known Islamist/revivalist Abul A'la Maududi translates it as "interest" in his The Meaning of the Qur'an.) and the widespread belief among Muslims that all loan or bank interest is riba forms the basis of the $2 trillion Islamic banking industry. However, not all Islamic scholars have equated riba with all forms of interest; nor do they agree on whether riba is a major sin or simply discouraged (makruh), or on whether it is a violation of Sharia law to be punished by humans rather than by God.

The primary variety or form of riba is the interest or other 'increase' on a loan of money—known as riba an-nasiya. Most Islamic jurists also acknowledge another type of riba: the simultaneous exchange of unequal quantities or qualities of some commodity—known as riba al-fadl.

== Etymology and definitions ==
The word riba was used by the Arabs prior to Islam to refer to an "increase". In classical Islamic jurisprudence, the definition of riba was "surplus value without counterpart".

The difficulty of defining riba in Islam was noted by early Islamic jurists such as Ibn Majah and Ibn Kathir, who quotes the second Rashidun Caliph Umar ibn al-Khattab:

"There are three things, If God's Messenger had explained them clearly, it would have been dearer to me than the world and what it contains: (These are) kalalah, riba, and khilafah." (Note: Taqi Usmani maintains, "a deeper study of the statement of Sayyidna Umar, Radi-Allahu anhu, reveals that he was doubtful only about the Riba al-fadl mentioned in the hadith cited above, and not about the original Riba ...")

Taqi Usmani—"one of the leading" modern day "religious experts on Islamic finance"—disagrees, arguing that scripture concerning riba could not possibly be ambiguous (mutashabihat) because God would not condemn a practice without revealing its "correct nature" to Muslims.

=== Definitions ===
Definitions of riba include:

- Unjustified increment in borrowing or lending money, paid in kind or in money above the amount of loan, as a condition imposed by the lender or voluntarily promised by the borrower. This is called fiqh riba al-duyun (debt usury) (Abdel-Rahman Yousri Ahmad).
- Unequal exchange. In addition to loan interest, this can include the exchange of nonequivalent quantities of goods (riba al-fadl) or unequal exposure to risk (Olivier Roy).
- All forms of interest, "any excess on the principal sum of loan", i.e. any and all interest, irrespective of how much is lent, whether the borrower is rich or poor, or the use of the loan for investment or for consumption. Some translations of verses of the Quran substitute the word "interest" for riba or "usury". This is the "orthodox" or "conservative" view of classical jurists, as well as revivalists such as Abul A'la Maududi.

The orthodox revivalist Taqi Usmani gives these definitions for riba al-Quran:

- A contract of loan or debt for any additional amount over the principal and for the three varieties of riba-al-sunnah:
- An exchange of money "of the same denomination where the quantity" exchanged is not equal, whether it is in a spot transaction or with deferred payment.
- "A barter exchange between two weighable or measurable commodities of the same kind", where either the quantity exchanged is not equal, or delivery of one side is deferred (riba al-fadl).
- "A barter exchange between two different weighable or measurable commodities where the delivery of one side is deferred."

Some sources (John Esposito, Cyril Glasse, Ludwig W. Adamec) emphasize a dichotomy in the prohibition of riba, with classical scholars and orthodox revivalists interpreting its meaning broadly and strictly, and others using a narrower definition which is more easily evaded in modern practice.

- Broad definition of interest: "Prohibiting any loan contract that specifies a fixed return to the lender" on the grounds that it provides "unearned profit" and imposes "an unfair obligation on the borrower". In the modern era Islamists and revivalists preach that all interest is socially unjust and should be banned (John Esposito).
- Narrower definition in most Muslim-majority countries: riba means "excessive interest" (Note: Cyril Glasse gives a declaration by Muhammad Abduh that "moderate interest" was lawful as an example.) or "compound interest" (John Esposito). (Note: "In the modern world, most Muslim countries allow the charging of moderate interest, prohibiting only usurious or compound interest, although some reformers condemn all interest...") However, they allow interest-like charges, described as "commission" (Cyril Glasse), or legal subterfuges (ḥiyal), such as a lender buying something from the borrower for cash, while arranging to sell it back later for a greater amount (Ludwig Adamec).

Some Islamic modernists emphasize the moral prohibition on exploiting the needy, defining riba not as interest on all loans, but only "exploitive" loans, including: (Note: Author M.A. Khan has created a list of "possible meanings of the term riba" of which some are: Interest on any kind of loan; Interest on consumption loans but not business loans; Compound interest but not other kinds of interest; Exorbitant rates of interest; Interest on loans to the poor and needy)

- Loans for consumption not investment: investment loan interest is allowed, since such loans were allegedly unknown in Mohammed's time, and by their nature earn borrowers a return with which to pay the interest (proposed in the 1930s by Syrian scholar Marouf al-Daoualibi);
- Loans motivated by a desire of risk-free return, with no concern to whether the funds are invested to enhance the earning ability of the lender (Muhammad Akram Khan).
- Loans charging compound rather than simple interest (an interpretation proposed in the 1940s by Egyptian jurist al-Sanhuri);
- Loans at "exorbitant" interest rates;
- Loans to the poor and needy, or
- Loans to the economically strong (eg, a bank) from the economically vulnerable (eg, the holder of an interest-bearing savings account): this understanding would allow interest to be paid by large banks to individual deposit account holders (as creditors to the bank).

=== Varieties ===
According to various ahadith, the prophet Muhammad said there are either 70, 72, or 73 varieties of riba, without giving specifics. Most Islamic jurists (fuqaha) describe several different kinds of riba:

- Riba al-jahiliya: usury in pre-Islamic Arabia (Quran 3:130). Scholars differ on its definition. According to Raqiub Zaman and M.O. Farooq, a riba al-jahiliya debt was "doubled and redoubled" each year if the borrower could not pay what was owed. Another similar definition (described by Taqi Usmani) is that riba al-jahiliya was a kind of loan where the borrower was not charged any additional amount above the principal, unless they could not repay when the loan was due, in which case they were charged an additional amount, but not necessarily double or triple the principal. (Note: According to Usmani, this interpretation is misguided especially because it means that the modern form of interest-bearing loan where an increased amount is stipulated in the initial agreement of loan, is not forbidden by the Quran but only by the Sunnah and thus is not totally forbidden (haram) but only discouraged (Makruh) in Islam.) Usmani believes both of these definitions are incorrect, and that in reality a number of transactions where "an increased amount was charged on the principal amount of a debt" were in vogue at this time and can be considered riba al-jahiliya. Other orthodox scholars agree and state riba al-jahiliya, riba an-nasiya, riba ad-duyun, riba al-Quran, riba al-qardh are all names for one of the two types of riba (the second type being riba al-fadl).
- Riba an-nasiya: the excess accruing from a loan transaction. Riba an-nasiya is the riba on a credit transaction, when two quantities of items are exchanged, but one or both parties delays delivery or payment and pays interest (i.e. excess monetary compensation in the form of a predetermined percentage amount or percentage) (Taqi Usmani quotes Fakhruddin Al-Raazi as saying "riba an-nasiah, it was a transaction well-known and recognized in the days of jahiliya").
- Riba al-fadl, also riba al-sunna: excess accruing in a sale or barter transaction, i.e. riba involving the simultaneous exchange (not involving any deferred/delayed payment) of unequal quantities or qualities of a given commodity. Riba al-fadl and prohibition of it—according to Usmani—was developed by Muhammad (hence the name riba al-sunna), and so was not part of pre-Islamic jahiliya.

Still another source (the Takaful Basic Exam preparation of Islamic Banking and Finance Institute Malaysia and Aznan Hasan) describes two types of riba, each with two sub sets (its definition of riba Nasi'ah seems different from others):

Types of Riba
Types of riba	Description	Sub-type of riba	Description
Riba Duyun	Unjustified increment in money lent whether in kind or cash over and above the principal amount.	Riba Qard	Increase (interest) on the principal sum of the loan is agreed upon at the point of contract
Riba Duyun	Unjustified increment in money lent whether in kind or cash over and above the principal amount.	Riba Jahiliyyah	Increase levied on the borrower for late repayment or failure to repay the financial loan
Riba Buyu	Occurs in trading and exchange transactions, in which unequal exchange of certain commodities (gold, silver, dates, etc.) of same kind and same basis.	Riba Fadl	Due to unequal amount/quantity
Riba Buyu	Occurs in trading and exchange transactions, in which unequal exchange of certain commodities (gold, silver, dates, etc.) of same kind and same basis.	Riba Nasi'ah	Due to extension of time of delivery

== History ==
=== Riba al-jahiliya ===
John Esposito describes riba as a pre-Islamic practice in Arabia "that doubled a debt if the borrower defaulted and redoubled it if the borrower defaulted again". It was held responsible for enslaving some destitute Arab borrowers.

Abdullah Saeed quotes the son of Zayd b. Aslam (died 136/754) on what the Quran 3:129-130 means by riba being "doubled and redoubled":

"Riba in the pre-Islamic period consisted of the doubling and redoubling [of money or commodities], and in the age [of the cattle]. At maturity, the creditor would say to the debtor, "Will you pay me, or increase [the debt]?". If the debtor had anything, he would pay. Otherwise, the age of the cattle [to be repaid] would be increased ... If the debt was money or a commodity, the debt would be doubled to be paid in one year, and even then, if the debtor could not pay, it would be doubled again; one hundred in one year would become two hundred. If that was not paid, the debt would increase to four hundred. Each year the debt would be doubled."

Orthodox Islamic scholar and Islamic banking advocate Taqi Usmani disagrees. In describing "riba in the days of Jahiliyya", he makes no mention of debts being doubled, but states that riba "had different forms" and that "the common feature of all these transactions is that an increased amount was charged on the principal amount of a debt".

=== Riba ===
According to orthodox sources (Youssouf Fofanaa, Taqi Usmani), "some jurists" saw riba (which Fofanaa defines as interest) "forbidden early in Mecca, some in the year 2 AH (after Muhammad left Mecca for Medina), and some after the opening of Mecca, but the majority agreed on its prohibition". Usmani cites sources declaring that 3:130 "clearly" forbade interest and these verses were revealed in 2 AH.

Other sources—such as the Encyclopedia of Islam and the Muslim World—state that early Muslims disagreed on whether all or only exorbitant rates of interest could be considered riba, and thus declared forbidden, but the broader definition won out with a consensus of Muslim jurists holding that any loan that involved an increase in repayments was forbidden. (Note: According to M.O. Farooq, "At the time of the revelation of the verses about riba, the only type of riba known was riba al-jahiliyyah [which doubled and redoubled late loan payments] However, later, the scope of the definition of riba was broadened based on hadith.) One particular jurist (al-Jassas, died 981, who is criticized by Modernists) is credited with establishing the orthodox definition of riba—stipulating that it was excess payment "in a loan or debt" (i.e. interest on debt). M. A. Khan argues that attempts to ban interest resulted in either the development of black markets and higher prices for "interest-bearing credit", which "defeat[ed] the very purpose for which interest was banned"; or in various "subterfuges to camouflage interest so as to bypass the legal sanctions".

Some (scholar Timur Kuran) attribute the basis of religious condemnation of interest on loans to the widespread practice in the ancient world of selling loan defaulters into slavery and shipping them to foreign lands. Feisal Khan argues that "all pre-modern, and not just Muslim societies" banned interest on loans, using a ban as "a simple and effective risk-mitigation mechanism for small borrowers that cannot afford the down-side risk inherent in financial transactions". Among other monotheist Abrahamic religions, Christian theologians condemned interest as an "instrument of avarice", the Jewish Torah prohibited lending at interest to fellow Jews, but allowed it to non-Jews (i.e. Gentiles) (Deut. 23:20) (historically many Jews were led to money lending with interest as a profession because of this exemption and because they were barred from many professions in Christian territories). With modernity and economic development, higher incomes and more complex mechanisms such as insurance eliminated the need for the ban. This, rather than religious backsliding, explains the lack of interest in the ban among the contemporary Christian and Jewish counterparts of the Islamic ulema (according to Feisal Khan).

(According to two other sources—International Business Publications (Note: According to International Business Publications, the "common view of riba among classical jurists" of Islamic law during the "Islamic Golden Age" was that interest charges on loans based on the traditional gold and silver currencies was unlawful, but applying "interest to fiat money — currencies made up of other materials such as paper or base metals — to an extent" was not riba. Thus, when "currencies of base metal were first introduced in the Islamic world", Islamic jurists did not forbid interest charges on them as riba.) and Egyptian Grand Mufti Ali Gomaa (Note: According to Grand Mufti Ali Gomaa, speaking on his TV programme "`Wallah Aalam`, circa January 2015 `The four imams, al-Shafii, Ibn Hanbal, Malik and Abu Hanifah, stated that usury is restricted to gold and silver, while banks deal with money.` He also stated that modern banking interest is different from usury and that the relationship between individuals and banks is "not based on loans, but rather on financing and investment.")—riba is restricted to exchanges involving currencies of gold and silver, and so does not apply to loans of paper currency. Thus, when "currencies of base metal were first introduced in the Islamic world", Islamic jurists did not forbid interest charges on them as riba.)

Historically, while the Islamic states followed classical jurisprudence in prohibiting an increase in repayments on loans (interest) in theory, in practice the giving and taking of interest continued in Muslim society "at times through the use of legal ruses (hiyal), often more or less openly". One common Ottoman era stratagem to circumvent of the ban on interest, according to Timur Kuran, was known as istiglal and involved the borrower selling his house to a lender and immediately leasing it back. The proceeds of the sale served as the sum loaned, the lease/rent/mortgage payment served as principal and interest repayment of the loan. According to Kuran, only transactions "that satisfied the letter of the ban" on interest "through stratagems" (hiyal) were allowed. In addition, in the sixteenth century, an Ottoman sultan "limited the annual rate of interest to 11.5%" "throughout the empire" on these loans. This order "was duly ratified by a legal opinion (fetva)". Another source (Feisal Khan) quotes several sources indicating the Ottoman Empire forbid as riba only interest rates above a certain level (about 10–20%).

According to Minna Rozen, the business of money lending was completely in the hands of Jewish Sarrafs in the Ottoman Empire. Europeans who visited Ottoman Empire stated that Ottoman economy would not function without these Sarrafs, though they sometimes were accused of cheating. In Persia, money lending was also dominated by Jewish Sarrafs. In nineteenth century Shiraz, for example, almost all Jews were active in lending money on interest.

Taqi Usmani maintains that outside of Dar al-Islam, riba (interest on loans) allowed the Rothschild family to "acquired financial mastery over the whole of Europe and the Rockfeller [sic] over the whole of America".

=== Modernism ===
The orthodox prohibition on interest was reconsidered by Islamic Modernists starting in the late 19th century in reaction to the rise of European power and influence during the Ages of Enlightenment, Discovery and colonialism. According to author Gilles Kepel, for many years in the 20th century, the fact that interest rates and insurance were among the "preconditions for productive investment" in a functioning modern economy led many Islamic jurists to strive to "find ways of" justifying the use of interest "without appearing to bend the rules laid down" in the Quran. In the largest Arab Muslim country, Egypt, Modernist Grand Mufti Muhammad Abduh declared collecting interest on bank deposits and loans permissible in 1900. From then up to the year 2002, successive Muftis have declared riba "prohibited, permissible, and prohibited and then permissible again".

=== Revivalism ===
In the late 20th century (mid-1970s) however, Islamic revivalists/activists/Islamists have worked to revive and rejuvenate the definition of interest as riba, to enjoin Muslims to lend and borrow at "Islamic Banks" that avoided fixed rates, and to mobilize to pressure governments to ban the charging of interest. (Note: According to Feisal Khan, the "first Muslim economist with extensive formal graduate training and experience in Western economics" to espose the orthodox view that all and any interest was riba was Anwar Iqbal Qureshi in his book Islam and the Theory of Interest, "originally published in 1945" in India.) In 1976, King Abdulaziz University in Jeddah organized the First International Conference on Islamic Economics in Makkah. At the conference, "several hundred Muslim intellectuals, Shari'ah scholars and economists unequivocally declared ... that all forms of interest [were] riba". By 2009, over 300 banks and 250 mutual funds around the world complied with this definition of riba and disavowed interest on loans or deposits, and by 2014 around $2 trillion in assets were "sharia-compliant".

The prime example being modern scholars such as Grand Mufti of Saudi Arabia, Abd al-Aziz Bin Baz, based their fatwas about riba definition on the basis of Ahadith that narrated by Ubadah ibn al-Samit.

== Scripture on riba ==
Both the Quran and the Hadith of Muhammad mention riba. Orthodox scholars such as Mohammad Najatuallah Siddiqui and Taqi Usmani believe Quranic verses (2:275-280) define riba to mean any payment "over and above the principal" of a loan. Others disagree with this definition (such as non-orthodox economists Mohammad Omar Farooq and Muhammad Ahram Khan, and scholar Fazlur Rahman Malik), and/or emphasize the importance of ahadith (Farhad Nomani, Fazlur Rahman Malik and Abdulkader, with Farooq stating "it is broadly agreed that the Qur'an does not define riba").

=== Quran and prohibition ===
Twelve verses in the Quran deal with riba (although not all of them mention the word). The word (usually translated as usury) appearing eight times in total—three times in 2:275, and once each in verses 2:276, 2:278, 3:130, 4:161 and 30:39.

The Mekkan verse in Surah Ar-Rum was the first to be revealed on the topic:

And what you give in usury (riba), that it may increase upon the people's wealth, increases not with God; (Quran 30:39)

Other Medinan verses are:

... for their taking usury (riba), that they were prohibited, ... (Surah An-Nisaa Quran 4:161) O believers, devour not usury (riba), doubled and redoubled, and fear you God; haply so you will prosper. (Surah Al-i-'Imran Quran 3:129-130) (Note: يَا أَيُّهَا الَّذِينَ آمَنُواْ لاَ تَأْكُلُواْ الرِّبَا أَضْعَافًا مُّضَاعَفَةً وَاتَّقُواْ اللّهَ لَعَلَّكُمْ تُفْلِحُونَ (Quran 3:129-130))

Culminating with the verses in Surah Baqarah:

Those who devour usury (riba) shall not rise again except as he rises, whom Satan of the touch prostrates; that is because they say, 'Trade is like usury (riba).' God has permitted trade, and forbidden usury (riba). Whosoever receives an admonition from his Lord and gives over, he shall have his past gains, and his affair is committed to God; but whosoever reverts—those are the inhabitants of the Fire, therein dwelling forever.

God blots out usury, but freewill offerings He augments with interest. God loves not any guilty ingrate. Those who believe and do deeds of righteousness, and perform the prayer, and pay the alms – their wage awaits them with their Lord, and no fear shall be on them, neither shall they sorrow. O believers, fear you God; and give up the usury (riba) that is outstanding, if you are believers. But if you do not, then take notice that God shall war with you, and His Messenger; yet if you repent, you shall have your principal, unwronging and unwronged. And if any man should be in difficulties, let him have respite till things are easier; but that you should give freewill offerings is better for you, did you but know. (Quran 2:275-280) (Note: ذَٰلِكَ بِأَنَّهُمْ قَالُوا إِنَّمَا الْبَيْعُ مِثْلُ الرِّبَا ۗ وَأَحَلَّ اللَّهُ الْبَيْعَ وَحَرَّمَ الرِّبَا (from Quran 2:276))

=== Interpretations ===
According to Youssouf Fofana and Taqi Usmani, jurists do not consider the verses 30:39 and 4:161 to clearly prohibit Muslims from riba, whereas the latter two (3:129-130 and 2:275-280) do. Another orthodox scholar, M.N. Siddiqi, also believes 2:275-80 "establishes" that riba is "what is over and above the principal" and that "it is unjust". According to Fofana, historically (most) jurists agreed on the prohibition of riba from these verses and termed it riba al-nasia, distinguishing it from riba al-fadl (the exchange of like goods in different quantities at the same time, mentioned in a number of narrations).

- verse 30:39 provides "insufficient indication" to prohibit riba, according to Fofana, because sources disagree on what it refers to. Muhammad ibn Jarir al-Tabari quotes a number of Tabi'een (Muslims who were born after Muhammad died but who were old enough to be contemporaries of the Sahaba "Companions"), who state that (Quran 30:39) refers to a gift, whereas al-Jawzi quotes Hasan al-Basri as stating it refers to riba.
- Verse 4:161 refers to the Jews and their taking of riba, but it is unclear if the prohibition applies to the Muslims (according to Usmani and Fofana).
- However 3:129-130 is seen by many—including Taqi Usmani and Ibn Hajar al-Asqalani (a medieval Shafiite Sunni scholar of Islam)—as prohibiting riba. Fofana however, thinks "the verse itself could be interpreted as expressing a preference against interest", so interpreting the verse as prohibiting riba may require support from some ahadith "relating to Amr ibn Aqyash".
- Mohammad Nejatullah Siddiqi, interprets Quranic verses (2:275-2:280, known as ayat al-riba) to mean that riba is not only "categorically prohibited" and "unjust" (zulm), but is defined as any payment "over and above the principal" of a loan. Youssouf Fofana and Taqi Usmani and other orthodox sources agree. (Note: A scholar for "The noble verses have decisively prohibited riba al-nasi'ah which involves, what is generally understood in our times as the giving of a principal amount on loan for a given period against the payment of riba in percentage terms on a monthly or annual basis.")

==== Questions and replies ====
On the other hand, some believe the "riba verses" (2:275-280) to be ayat al-mujmalat ("ambiguous" verses). These include the second caliph `Umar, (according to Al-Shafi'i jurist Fakhr al-Din al-Razi), and a number of classical jurists, including Ibn Rushd (see below). Other Classical Islamic jurists considered the term riba "speculative general" rather than a "specific" (khass), or absolute or unqualified (mutlaq). They restricted the application of riba to "the clarification by the Tradition [ahadith] ...". According to Farhad Nomani, in studying scholarly "commentaries, one notes that the technical, and even to some extent the customary meaning of riba as a practice in pre-Islamic era, is a matter of controversy among classical jurists and the interpreters of the Qur'an." Other classical jurists ("like al-Baji and al-Tawwafi, to name only two"), believed riba was `amma, a "general term" meaning it "is definitive or free of speculative content", according to Farhad Nomani.

Umar, also declared that Muhammad died before he could explain the verse of riba (among 2:275-280) fully—it being the last revealed verse of the Qur'an according to a hadith reported by Ibn Majah. (However, according to Taqi Usmani, this hadith is not as authentic as that of another where one of the narrators in the change of transmission was more reliable. This hadith indicates that the last verse was actually 2:281—one not mentioning riba.)

Raqiub Zaman argues against the orthodox translation of riba as any:

"excess or addition—i.e. an addition over and above the principal sum that is lent." If Muslim jurists are referring to interest as usury on the basis of this literal meaning of riba, than naturally one wonders why God Almighty used the terms `doubling` and `quadrupling` (the sum lent) as usury in 3:130 ... and why there was no further clarification of this verse in the Quran or by the Prophet.

Taqi Usmani argues that the words "doubled" and "tripled" in the verse are not "restrictive" of the prohibition of riba, and like some other words in the Quran are not to be taken literally but are used "for emphasis or for explaining".

The background of these verses was the dispute between two clans, Banu Thaqif and Banu Amr ibn al-Mughirah. The verse is addressed to the Banu Thaqifa who insisted that they be able to collect riba from the Banu Amr ibn al-Mughirah for a loan made to them, despite having signed a peace treaty forgoing claims of riba.

According to Fofana, historically (most) jurists agreed on the prohibition of riba from these verses. Disagreeing with the orthodoxy is author/economist Muhammad Akram Khan who writes that since the verse ("O believers, fear you God; and give up the usury (riba) that is outstanding, if you are believers") is addressed to the Banu Thaqifa it is (according to Khan) a "specific reference" addressing a "historical situation" and does "not institute a law that could make dealings in riba a state crime."

=== Quran and credit sales and late payment ===
While orthodox scholars believe the Quran declares interest (or any increased repayment of a loan) to be forbidden riba, orthodox scholars (including Taqi Usmani, and Monzer Kahf) (Note: Scholar Monzer Kahf also argues that in quranic verse 2:275 the trade that "Allah has permitted" refers to credit sales.) believe it specifically allows giving credit in a sale and increasing the price for this deferred payment in some circumstances (for example charging RS21000 for 90 days credit for an appliance that would costs Rs20000 in cash on the spot). According to Taqi Usmani, in Quran aya 2:275,

"... they say, 'Trade is like usury,' [but] God has permitted trade, and forbidden usury .."

the reference to permitting "trade" refers to credit sales such as murabaha, the "forbidden usury" refers to late fees (charging extra when the repayment is late), and the "they" refers to non-Muslims who didn't understand why if one was allowed both were not. Usmani writes:

the objection of the infidels ... was that when they increase the price at the initial stage of sale, it has not been held as prohibited but when the purchaser fails to pay on the due date, and they claim an additional amount for giving him more time, it is termed as "riba" and haram. The Holy Qur'an answered this objection by saying: "Allah has allowed sale and forbidden riba."

Usmani interprets the verse to mean that it is a "misconception" to believe that "whenever price is increased, taking the time of payment into consideration, the transaction comes within the definition of interest" and thus riba. Charging extra for deferred payment in a credit sale such as murâbaḥah is not riba, but late charges are.

Regarding hadith, M.O. Farooq states "it is well-known and supported by many hadiths that the Prophet had entered into credit-purchase transactions (nasi'ah) and also that he paid more than the original amount." (Note: Sahih al-Bukhari, Vol. 3, #282, Narrated `A'ishah: "The Prophet purchased food grains from a Jew on credit and mortgaged his iron armur to him". (ishtara ta[aman min yahudi ila ajalin wa rahnahu dir[an min hadid; in al-Bukhari, Vol. 3, #309)) (Note: Sahih al-Bukhari, Vol. 3, #579, Narrated Jabir bin [Abdullah: "I went to the Prophet while he was in the Mosque. (Mis'ar thinks that Jabir went in the forenoon.) After the Prophet told me to pray two rak'ah, he repaid me the debt he owed me and gave me an extra amount".)

(While Usmani envisioned murâbaḥah being a limited part of the Islamic Banking industry, it has come to dominate it, often as a hiyal to lend cash. There is also general agreement in Islamic finance that finding a solution to delinquent murâbaḥah accounts continues to be a "challenge".)

=== Hadith and prohibition ===
Scholars such as Farhad Nomani, Abdulkader Thomas, (Note: "The Qur'an does not explicitly define riba as one type of transaction or another. ... The efforts of the fuqaha' or judicial scholars like Sh. Zuhayli and the examples of the hadith allow us to determine a clear idea of what is riba".) and M.O. Farooq argue that classical scholars believed that hadith (the body of reports of the teachings, deeds and sayings of the Islamic prophet Muhammad that often explain verses in the Quran) was needed to define riba.

M.O. Farooq states that "it is commonly argued" that riba is "defined by hadith". Thus the argument goes, textual proof for the position that all forms of interest are riba and hence prohibited by Islamic law is based on hadith. (Farooq argues that hadiths are contradictory and do not yield a definition.)

Some ahadith offered by Usmani as prohibiting any increase in the amount "charged on the principal amount of a debt" include:

- "Every loan which derives a benefit is a kind of riba."
- "If one of you has advanced a loan and the debtor offer the creditor a bowl (of food), he should not accept it, or if the debtor offers him a ride of his animal (cattle) the debtor must not take the ride ...".

According to Farhad Nomani, among the schools of fiqh, "... The classical Hanafi, some famous classical Shafi`i (e.g., al-Razi) and Maliki (e.g., Ibn Rushd) jurists were of the opinion that riba in the Qur'an was an ambiguous (mujmal) term, the meaning of which was not clear per se, and therefore the ambiguity had to be cleared by the Tradition" (another name for ahadith). (Note: Others agree. Non-orthodox scholar Mohammad Omar Farooq says, "it is broadly agreed that the Qur'an does not define riba", and quotes orthodox scholar Abdulkader Thomas, "the Qur'an does not explicitly define riba as one type of transaction or another. The efforts of the fuqaha' or judicial scholars like Sheikh Zuhayli and the examples of the hadith allow us to determine a clear idea of what is riba".)

Different sources report different types and numbers of riba-related ahadith. According to Farhad Nomani, there are "three principal types" of ahadith (Note: According to Farhad Nomani, "There are also other reports recorded in the hadith texts on other commodities such as meats, fruits, and slaves that indirectly refer to illicit "increases". In general, however, except for the aforementioned three types of reports of the sayings of the Prophet, other reports are not unanimous and are not equally relied on by jurists.") that deal with riba.

1. The "most accepted or reliable sayings", found in most compilations of ahadith, that state that riba exists when "six articles of the same kind are either bartered unequally or not delivered immediately". (see Riba al-Fadl)
2. Another set cite Ibn ʿAbbas, and report that there is "no riba except in deferment ... in delivery and/or payment".
3. A third set quote Muhammad's "sermon on the occasion of the last pilgrimage," where he is reported to have said:

"God has forbidden you to take riba, therefore all riba obligation shall henceforth be waived. Your capital, however, is yours to keep. You will neither inflict nor suffer inequity. God has judged that there shall be no riba and that all the riba due to `Abbas ibn `Abd al Muttalib shall henceforth be waived." (Note: Last Sermon of Muhammad given on 10 Dul-hajj 10 hijra, mentioned in all book of Hadith. Sahih Bukhari mentions parts of it. Musnad Imam Ahmed recorded the longest and complete speech. أَلَا إِنَّ كُلَّ رِبًا كَانَ فِي الْجَاهِلِيَّةِ، مَوْضُوعٌ عَنْكُمْ كُلُّهُ، لَكُمْ رُؤُوسُ أَمْوَالِكُم لَا تَظْلِمُونَ وَلَاتُظْلَمُونَ، وَأَوَّلُ رِبًا مَوْضُوعٍ، رِبَا الْعَبَّاسِ بْنِ عَبْدِالْمُطَّلِبِ مَوْضُوعٌ كُلُّه)

Similarly, M.A. Khan states "there are three sets of Traditions relating to riba", including the riba al-fadl and last pilgriamge sermon. (Note: 1. Those that deal with riba that arises in the exchange of commodities (riba al-fadl).; 2. those that define riba as something that accrues in loan or deferred payment transactions (riba al-nasi'ah); 3. those including Muhammad's sermon during his Last Pilgrimage that condemn the giving and taking of riba;) Another source, Abdulkader Thomas, states that "there are six authenticated ahadith that allow us to define" riba. And under "riba in hadith", Shariq Nisar of Global Islamic Finance, lists seven "general" ahadith and another six on "Riba al-Nasi'ah".

Several narrators including Jabir, Abdul Rahman ibn Abdullah ibn Masoud, say that

Muhammad cursed the accepter of usury and its payer, and one who records it, and the two witnesses, saying: They are all equal.

==== Questions ====
On the other hand, the ambiguity and lack of clarity of what constitutes riba is reported to have been indicated by Caliph ʿUmar, who included it among the three concepts that "it would have been dearer to me than the world" had Muhammad "explained them clearly" (see above), and twentieth century Islamic scholar, Fazlur Rahman Malik, who sums up his analysis of the ahadith on riba saying: "In short, no attempt to define riba in the light of Hadith has been so far successful".

According to Farhad Nomani, "it is known that Ibn `Abas", a companion of Muhammad, "was of the opinion that the only forbidden riba was the pre-Islamic riba." Nomani state that classical jurists "all agreed" that the meaning of riba was not "free of speculative content", because there was a difference between

- the "linguistic and customary meaning" of riba in the pre-Islamic period on the one hand, and
- "on the other hand", the "specification by the Tradition (the hadith) and the ambiguity of the opinions of the close companions of the Prophet on the problem" of the meaning of riba.

According to Abdullah Saeed, quoting Rashid Rida

none of the authentic hadith attributed to the Prophet in relation to riba appears to mention the terms, 'loan' (qard) or 'debt' (dayn). This absence of any reference to loans or debts in riba-related hadith led a minority of jurists to contend that what is actually prohibited as riba is certain forms of sales, which are referred to in the hadith literature.

According to another scholar, the mufti of Egypt, Dr. Muhammad Sayyid Tantawy, there is nothing in the Quran or Hadith that prohibits the pre-fixing of the rate of return, as long as it occurs with the mutual consent of the parties.

Arguments on scriptural support for prohibition

Arguing that Quran and hadith do not provide clear evidence that interest on loans is riba, Farooq notes that a number of early jurists held positions that are at variance with blanketly equating riba with interest. Some note the wording of aya 3:130,

Imam Ahmad ibn Hanbal (780–855 CE), believed only Riba al-jahiliya (where the amount owed "doubled and redoubled" each year if not paid off) was unlawful "without doubt from the Islamic viewpoint". According to Nabil A. Saleh, several companions (Sahabah) of Muhammad (Usama ibn Zayd, Abdullah ibn Masud, 'Urwah ibn Zubayr, Zayd ibn Arqam), including Ibn Abbas, one of the major companions of the Prophet and earliest of the Islamic jurists, also "considered that the only unlawful riba is riba al-jahiliyyah".

Classical jurists and most Muslims believe riba to be "a general term" with a broad definition of all interest, while

Fazlur Rahman defined riba as "exorbitant increment whereby the capital sum is doubled several-fold, against a fixed extension of the term of payment of the debt."

Farooq also questions traditionalist and activist orthodoxy, insisting the ahadith commonly cited as defining riba as interest are not unambiguous, as they must be when used as the basis for laws with impact on "people's life, honour and property" such as a ban on all interest does.

Farooq gives examples quoting a couple of ahadith stating there is no riba "in hand-to-hand [spot] transactions", or "except in nasi'ah [waiting]"—that seem to contradict the orthodox position that there is also riba in riba al-fadl, i.e. the "hand-to-hand" exchange of unequal amounts of the same commodity. (Note: such as: "Narrated Abu Said: We used to be given mixed dates (from the booty) and used to sell (barter) two Sas (of those dates) for one Sa (of good dates). The Prophet said (to us), "No (bartering of) two Sas [about six liters] for one Sa nor two Dirhams for one Dirham is permissible", (as that is a kind of usury)".) (Farooq notes a hadith where two Sahabah (companions of Muhammad) argue, one 'Ubadah b. al-Samit—stating Muhammad forbade riba al-fadl, while another Sahabah—Mu'awiyah—contradicts him, saying he never heard Muhammad forbid such trade, "though we saw him (the Prophet) and lived in his company?")

The "except in nasi'ah" hadith also seems to contradict the many ahadith describing Muhammad buying on credit and paying more (after "waiting") than the original amount. The distinction sometimes made that it is not riba to make voluntary, gift extra payments that are not stipulated in the sale agreement—such as Muhammad gave to Jabir bin 'Abdullah by when he paid back a loan, or when he repaid the loan of a camel giving two back, or another time giving a better quality camel than the original. But these ahadith are contradicted by the hadith stating "every loan that attracts a benefit/advantage is riba." (Note: Al-'Asqalani, al-Hafiz Ahmad Ibn Hajar, Bulugh al-Maram min Adillat al Ahkam, (multilithed material, I 25), quoted in Emad H. Khalil, "An Overview of the Shari[ah prohibition of riba," A similarly reported narration is from Ibn 'Abidin, Radd al-Muhtar, sharh tanwir al-absar, Kitab al-buyu', Bab al-murabahah wa'l-tawliyah (Beirut: Dar al-Kutub al-'ilmiyyah, 1994, vol. 7, pp. 294f (ed.), For more details, see Farooq, 2007c.) (Note: cited by orthodox scholars) as well as by hadith specifically forbidding accepting a gift when extending a loan. And all these ahadith addressing and warning the lender but saying nothing about or to the borrower, would appear to be at odds with the many ahadith who include comments such as "The receiver and the giver" of extra payment "are equally guilty."

== Importance of the ban ==
Replying to the non-orthodox, Taqi Usmani argues that scripture concerning riba must not be categorized as ambiguous (or mutashabihat) because God can not "wage war against a practice, the correct nature of which" is unknown by Muslims. Consequently, he would never reveal an unclear verse on the matter. Only those verses for which "no practical issue depends on its knowledge" may be ambiguous (according to Usmani).

Orthodox point to a number of ahadith indicating the gravity of the sin of committing riba. Abu Huraira is reported to have narrated:

The Prophet said, "Avoid the seven great destructive sins." The people inquire, "O God's Apostle! What are they? "He said, " To associate others in worship along with God, to practice sorcery, to kill the life which God has forbidden except for a just cause, (according to Islamic law), to eat up Riba (usury), to eat up an orphan's wealth, to give back to the enemy to flee from the battlefield at the time of fighting, and to accuse chaste women who never even think of anything touching chastity and are good believers." (Note: Sahih Muslim: 272, in Arabic: أخرج البخاري ومسلم وأبو داود والنسائي عن أبي هريرة رضي الله عنه أن رسول الله صلى الله عليه وسلم قال اجتنبوا السبع الموبقات ، قيل يا رسول الله وما هن ؟ قال الشرك بالله ، والسحر ، وقتل النفس التي حرم الله إلا بالحق ، وأكل مال اليتيم ، وأكل الربا ، والتولي يوم الزحف ، وقذف المحصنات الغافلات المؤمنات)

According to Sunan Ibn Majah, the Muhammad declared the practice of riba worse than "a man committing zina (fornication) with his own mother".In that hadeeth, he said that there are 70 sins of riba. Of these, the minimum sin is to commit adultery with oneself's mother, and the greatest riba is dishonoring any Muslim. In another Hadith, Muhammad said that, knowingly consuming one dirham of riba is equivalent to do adultery 36 times.

== Sharia/fiqh and riba ==
How Muslims should deal with riba is disputed. Some believe riba is a violation of sharia (Islamic law) to be prohibited by the state and violators punished. Others believe it is simply a sin to be left to God to judge and punish. (Note: According to Natalie Schoon, "riba is often considered a moral sin" rather than a criminal offense, much like interest in "medieval Europe".) Orthodox jurists tend to be less strict on its prohibition for Muslims in non-Muslims lands, and strictness tends to vary throughout the Muslim world with Sudan being the most severe and Malaysia the least.

At least one scholar (Abdulkader Thomas) has stated that not only is interest in violation of sharia, but is such a menace that failure to "combat" it indicates unbelief in Islam, (potentially punishable by death). According to Thomas, "Riba is part of a broader problem of belief and behavior. Refusing to combat riba is akin to disbelief. Conceding the argument that money has an intrinsic value is potentially a greater act of disbelief".

Author/economist Muhammad Akran Khan has noted that contemporary orthodox scholars have argued that interest is a violation of sharia law primarily on the basis of two sources:

- the Farewell Sermon (mentioned above where the Prophet abolished all claims of riba on loans),

God has decreed that there will be no usury, and the usury of 'Abbās b. 'Abd al-Muṭṭalib is abolished, all of it.

- and the fact that the Banu Thaqif clan was threatened with war by Muhammad for abrogation of their treaty with the early Muslims if they tried to collect interest on loans from Muslims. (Banu Thaqif are the ones who are warned against "being at war with God and His messenger" in Quran 2:275-280.)

However, M.A. Khan argues, "the Prophet could easily have announced the broad features of such a law [against Riba]. The fact is that neither the Prophet nor the Qur'an has announced any law relating to interest", as they had "in the case of theft, adultery or murder. ... Neither the Prophet nor the first four caliphs nor any subsequent Islamic government ever enacted any law against riba." Attempts to do so are "quite recent".

The "authentic books of Islamic jurisprudence (fiqh) produced throughout Islamic history" had "sections dealing with riba", discussing "its nature and what makes a transaction lawful or unlawful", but according to M.A. Khan, until recently none contained "any public law for enforcement through state machinery." The treasure of Islamic jurisprudence which has covered all facets of life, including imaginary situations, does not mention any punishment for one who indulges in riba." In 1999 a work did. The Blueprint of Islamic financial system including strategy for elimination of Riba by the International Institute of Islamic Economics, called for riba-based transactions to be punishable by law.

Another (non-Muslim) scholar (Olivier Roy) points out Ayatollah Ruhollah Khomeini's book of fatawa Tawzih al-masa'il, written before 1962, (Note: Although Tawzih al-masa'il or Resaleh Towzih al-Masa'el was published in 1961, most of it was copied, not written by Khomeini. "Resaleh Towzih al-Masa'el is a sort of template, the original having been written by the revered Ayatollah Sayyid Hossein Borujerdi a decade earlier. Borujerdi's book in turn was based on a turn-of-the-century text by Sayyid Kazem Yazdi's (died 1919) `Urwat al-wuthqa ("The Handle of Trust"), making Resaleh ... a relatively newfangled work by the standards of Shi'a clerics. Khomeini was one of many mujtahid clerics who published copies of the work with slight variations on the original, though which parts are Borujerdi's original fatwas and which are Khomeini's input is not explained.") as an example of a more traditionalist attitude toward riba, or at least the charging of interest on loans. Rather than calling for a ban on interest, Khomeini states that lending without charging interest, "is among the good works" (Mustahabb) that are "particularly recommended in the verses of the Quran and in the Hadiths."

=== Scriptural proof and fiqh ===
According to Farhad Nomani while classical jurists had "a consensus of opinion about the prohibition of riba", they disagreed on the "interpretation of the primary Islamic sources and, consequently, over the details of the ruling on riba". They believed that the "objects of riba occur in sale, and, only by analogy they related riba to loan ..."

Madhhab (schools of fiqh), differ somewhat in their interpretation of riba. The Shafi'i hold that injunctions for riba apply to gold and silver currency but not fils (non-precious metal currency). "Thus, one hundred fils [coins made of neither silver or gold] could be exchanged for two hundred either on the spot or on a deferred delivery basis." By extension this would apply to contemporary fiat [i.e. paper] money, according to Abdullah Saeed.

(One author—Imad-ad-Dean Ahmad—argues "ribâ as it is used in the Qur'an and sunnah" is not the same as interest, but the failure to back currency with precious metals. This is not because riba can only involve loans using gold and silver currency, but because instead of interest riba is actually the "now common practice of issuing unbacked paper currency". To end this sin, Muslim states must return to the gold standard.)

Critic of the all-interest-is-riba formulation, M.O.Farooq, makes a number of criticisms of logic employed using ahadith to establish the connection.

- When it comes to "people's life, honor and property" special care should be taken formulating "laws, codes or dogmas" (such as forbidding interest on loans) in terms of scriptural backing. For example, even high quality sahih ahadith provide "probabilistic" and not "certain knowledge" of what it was that Muhammad taught. (Only a very few ahadith provide "certain" knowledge, and none of them address riba.) (Note: In light of this he complains that one hadith cited by orthodox scholars and purported to be "rigorously authenticated" — "Riba is of seventy three kinds, the lightest in seriousness of which is as bad as one's marrying his own mother; for the Muslim who practices riba goes mad." turns out to be da'if (i.e. weak))
- In defining riba, the "underlying reason" for why it is forbidden should be given first consideration, but in fact this reason—justice—has been given short shrift in orthodox scholarship. Taqi Usmani dismisses "justice" as an element of sharia on the ground that "Zulm (injustice) is a relative and rather ambiguous term the exact definition of which is very difficult to ascertain. Every person may have his own view about what is or what is not Zulm." Two orthodox writers (Abu Umar Faruq Ahmad and M. Kabir Hassan), admit that the idea that the rationale for prohibition of riba as formulated in al-Qur'an was injustice and hardship finds some support in Quranic verse 2:279 and in the works of some early scholars like Imam Razi and Ibn Qayyim for whom "it appears that what is prohibited is the exploitation of the needy, rather than the interest itself". (Note: Also criticizing the "focus on particular economic injunctions of the Qur'an" at the expense of wider "Islamic imperatives of equality and social justice" are Izzud-Din Pal and Yoginder Sikand.)

Farooq cites another critic, Abdullah Saeed, who complains that the schools of Islamic jurisprudence have ignored "rationale/wisdom" (hikmah) and arrived at a legal "cause" (`illa) to determine what was riba "which had nothing to do with the circumstances of the transaction, the parties thereto, or the importance of the commodity to the survival of society." One result of this legalistic thinking is that hiyal could be and has been used "from the medieval period to the present day", to create loans based on "fictitious transactions" charging "exorbitant rates of interest" approved by orthodox jurists as lacking riba.

A similar argument in favor of the objectives rather than means is made by Mahmud El-Gamal. In favor of making analysis of istislah (public interest) rather than qiyas, (i.e., using analogy to apply injunctions to new circumstances) "the final arbiter in the area of financial transactions", Gamal quotes the twentieth-century Azhari jurist and legal theorist Abdul-Wahhab Khallaf:

"Benefit analysis and other legal proofs may lead to similar or different rulings. ... In this regard, maximizing net benefit is the objective of the law for which rulings were established. Other legal proofs are means to attaining that legal end [of maximizing net benefits], and objectives should always have priority over means."

El-Gamal quotes 14th century Maliki scholar Al-Shatibi stating that the legal ends of Islamic law "are the benefits intended by the law. Thus, one who keeps legal form while squandering its substance does not follow the law."

El-Gamal also finds it curious that classical jurists consider urf (or adherence to convention or customary practice) an important "legal consideration" (Note: El-Gamal says he has "counted 130 references to rulings justified by `urf in the Hanafi Al-Sarakhsi's Al-Mabsut, 95 references in the Hanafi Al-Kasani's Bada˘ i Al-Sana˘i˘, 237 references in the Hanafi Ibn ˘Abidin's Hashiyat Radd Al-Muhtar (which is the main source for the Ottoman Majalla, and a favorite – often only – reference used by Justice M. Taqi Usmani to justify current practice in Islamic finance), 1,182 references in the Maliki Al-Kharshi's Sharh Mukhtasar Khalil, 60 references in the Shafi˘i Al-Nawawi's Al-Majmu˘ (completed by Taqiyyuddin Al-Subki), and 102 references in the Hanbali Ibn Qudama's Al-Mughni. It is particularly interesting that most of those references to customary practice pertained to rules of credit sales (murabaha) and leases (ijara), which are the most dominant tools of contemporary Islamic finance.") (for example Hanafi jurist Al-Sarakhsi writes "establishment [of rights, etc.] by customary practice is akin to establishment by canonical texts"), (Note: Likewise, Ibn Al-Humam stated in Fath Al-Qadir that "customary practice is legally equivalent to juristic consensus in the absence of canonical texts.") and one that is not fixed but changes as customary practice changes. But when it come to banking, contemporary orthodox scholars do not consider "customary practices" to constitute a "legal consideration".

Future

Mohammad Omar Farooq argues the prevailing doctrine of interest-equals-riba may eventually follow other such "long-standing orthodox" but no longer accepted practices such as hadd capital punishment for apostasy from Islam, or that "triple talaq" (i.e. by a husband divorcing his wife by declaiming "talaq" aloud three times).

== Issues in interest as riba an-nasiya ==
=== Opposing sides ===
Most Muslims and most "non-Muslim observers of the Islamic world" believe that interest on loans (also on bonds, bank deposits etc.) is forbidden by Islam. (Such loans—or banks that make them—are sometimes referred to as ribawi, i.e. carrying riba.) This "orthodox" position (Note: also called "by far the most influential") is fortified by "voluminous and overwhelming" scholarly literature. Among the Islamic bodies that have declared all interest to be riba include the First International Conference on Islamic Economics (1976), the Fiqh Academy of the Organisation of Islamic Cooperation (1986), the Research Council of al-Azhar University (1965), and the Federal Shariah Court of Pakistan in a 1991 judgement. Scholars and authors who have declaring that there is a religious consensus (ijma) on the subject include Abul A'la Maududi (1903–79), Yusuf al-Qaradawi, Wahbah al-Zuhayli, Tariq Talib al-Anjari, Thanvir Ahmed, Mabid al-Jarhi, M.N. Siddiqi, Munawar Iqbal and Imran Ahsan Khan Nyazee. In the discipline of Islamic economics, a prohibition of interest on loans in the name of prohibiting riba has been called that field's "most salient objective".

Its importance among Islamists/revivalist Muslims is reflected in the size of the Islamic financial industry built on the basis of the orthodox position (approximately $2 trillion as of 2017), and in expressions such as the uproar that temporarily shutdown the Pakistan parliament in 2004 when a Member of Parliament (MP) had the temerity to quote an Egyptian Islamic scholar decreeing that bank interest was not un-Islamic. (In response—after the parliament was reopened—an Islamist MP stated that no member of parliament had the right to question this "settled issue" since the Pakistan state Council of Islamic Ideology had decreed that interest in all its forms was haram in an Islamic society.) (Note: Taking part in the budget debate, M.P. Bhindara, a minority MNA [Member of the National Assembly] ... referred to a decree by an Al-Azhar University's scholar that bank interest was not riba and not un-Islamic [the article does not mention the name of the jurist but Ali Gomaa has gone on record as allowing bank interest]. He said without interest the country could not get foreign loans and could not achieve the desired progress. A pandemonium broke out in the house over his remarks as a number of MMA members...rose from their seats in protest and tried to respond to Mr Bhindara's observations. However, they were not allowed to speak on a point of order that led to their walkout.... Later, the opposition members were persuaded by a team of ministers... to return to the house ... the government team accepted the right of the MMA to respond to the minority member's remarks. ... Sahibzada Fazal Karim said the Council of Islamic ideology had decreed that interest in all its forms was haram in an Islamic society. Hence, he said, no member had the right to question this settled issue.)

Among some (such as Imran Nazar Hosein) interest on loans constitutes not just a sin or crime but the

"grand design of hostile forces who have already made considerable progress, through riba, in gaining control over mankind. Their aim is to gain total control and to use that power to destroy faith in Allah."

However, not all Muslims agree with the "orthodox" formulation that any and all interest—including contemporary "bank interest" (as opposed to interest charged in predatory, unfair or abusive lending)—constitutes riba. (Note: Over the past two centuries, there have been two conflicting juristic views of the banking industry: one unfavorable and one favorable. The unfavorable view characterized traditional banking as usury or riba-based ... The other view, ... views contemporary banking practice as a new financial technology, which is not intrinsically forbidden,...) The "thin ranks" of notable contemporary non-orthodox scholars include Fathi Osman, Nawab Haider Naqvi, Salim Rashid, Imad al-Din Ahmed, Omar Afzal, Raquibuzzaman, Abdulaziz Sachedina, Abdullah Saeed, Mahmud El-Gamal and Mohammad Fadel.

While the minority status of non-orthodox scholars is uncontested, whether there is a consensus (ijma) in favor of orthodoxy, is. One non-orthodox economist (M.A. Khan) argues that a true consensus requires the agreement of not only most Islamic scholars but the Muslim community as a whole. (Note: This is disputed. "Muslims variously hold that the consensus is needed only among the scholars of a particular school, or legists, or legists of an early era, or the Companions, or scholars in general, or the entire Muslim community.") Since most Muslims have failed to choose interest-free Islamic banking for most of their assets, this demonstrates (according to Khan) that they do not agree that all interest is riba. (Note: Despite the "spectacular expansion" of Islamic Banking since 1980, Khan notes that most financial institutions are based on interest even in strict and orthodox countries — such as Saudi Arabia, Pakistan and Sudan — while in "a large number" of Muslim-majority countries, virtually all financial institutions are interest based. Khan cites a 2008 estimate of 2.2% of the "overall financial market" of Pakistan being made up of Islamic banks, 5% of total investment in Bangladesh being in Islamic banking (according to a 2005 report), and only 2.58% of total financing in Indonesia in Islamic finance (in 2006). In major Islamic banks themselves such as the Islamic Development Bank and Faisal Islamic Bank of Egypt excess funds "have always" been placed in interest-bearing accounts, "usually overseas". (Centers of Islamic banking are conflicted. Abdullah Saeed points out that in Kuwait where the Civil Code states "loans shall be without interest", the Commercial Code allows it. In Saudi Arabia where the charter of the Saudi Arabian Monetary Agency states: "the Saudi Arabian Monetary Agency shall not pay or receive interest ...", tradingeconomics.com reports the Monetary Agency has a "benchmark interest rate" (2 percent as of April 2015), and Saudi commercial banks — with the exception of the Al-Rajhi Bank — "conduct their business on the basis on interest". Government policy on charging of interest in Muslim majority states is complicated even in states that have supported Islamic (i.e. interest-free) Banking.: In Kuwait, Article 547 of the Civil Code states "loans shall be without interest. Any condition to the contrary shall be void without prejudice to the loan agreement itself". But that country's Commercial Code states "The creditor has the right to interest in a commercial loan unless the contrary is agreed."; In Saudi Arabia, chapter 2 of the charter of the Saudi Arabian Monetary Agency states: "the Saudi Arabian Monetary Agency shall not pay or receive interest but shall only charge certain fees on services rendered to the public and to the Government in order to cover the Agency's expenses." However tradingeconomics.com reports the Saudi Arabian Monetary Agency has a "benchmark interest rate" (2 percent as of April 2015). "Commercial banks in Saudi Arabia, except for the Al-Rajhi Bank, conduct their business on the basis on interest", and the Saudi Banking Control Law promulgated by Royal Decree no.M/5 of 22 Safar 1386AH is "totally silent" on the issue of interest.)

=== Overview of rationale and its critics ===
In answer to the question, "why has God prohibited interest?", a number of arguments have been advanced by orthodox/Islamist/revivalist scholars, preachers, writers and economists. They include that (in their view)

- interest is a form of exploitation by the lender of the borrower and/or by the rich of the poor, that brings more inequality in society;
- interest should not exist because money is unproductive and charging a price for it is unfair;
- it is unjust for a lender to receive a fixed return (i.e. interest) when the profits or losses of the borrower/entrepreneur vary, and/or to gain from financial activity without risk of potential loss;
- interest is unnecessary in a contemporary economy because investment capital can be generated justly by the sharing of risks and profits between financiers and entrepreneurs (and when that is impractical other financing of commodity and product purchases); this Islamic system of banking and finance will lead to greater prosperity and more human sympathy, economic stability, efficiency, development, etc.

At the same time that orthodox analysts offer rationale for why interest is forbidden, "more than one analyst"—including medieval Quranic exegete Fakhr al-Din al-Razi and leading orthodox scholar Taqi Usmani—have stressed that ultimately, Muslims must obey the prohibition even if they do not understand the reason for it. Usmani writes:

"The Holy Qur'an has itself decided what is injustice in a transaction of loan, and it is not necessary that everybody finds out all the elements of injustice in a riba transaction", [or even that] "the philosophy of the law" [be] "visible in a particular transaction". (Note: According to M.O. Farooq, this position taken by Taqi Usmani, is that of the Hanafi and the Shafi'i schools of jurisprudence but not of the Maliki and the Hanbali schools – although Usmani does not mention this. Quoting Mohammad Kamali, the Maliki and the Hanbali "do not draw any distinction between the `illah [the point of law] and the hikmah" ("the philosophy" or the objective of the point of law).) ...

"There are areas in which human reason cannot give proper guidance ... [thus] it is the firm belief of every Muslim that the commands given by the divine revelations ... are to be followed in letter and spirit and cannot be violated or ignored on the basis of one's rational arguments ..."

In any case, Usmani writes, injustice (zulm) "is a relative and rather ambiguous term the exact definition of which is very difficult to ascertain".

==== Criticism of rationale ====
Critics of the orthodox position—primarily Timur Kuran, Mohammad Omar Farooq, Muhammad Ahram Khan and Feisal Khan—generally argue that not only has God/Islam not forbidden bank interest, but that interest does not harm economic prosperity, the poor, or society in general. Some of their contentions are

- that bank interest is not riba,
  - the definition of which should be based on the unjust/exploitive lending practices of the Makkan society where the Quran was revealed,
  - and which is far removed from the much more benign bank lending of contemporary society where most lending is for commercial purposes to large, sophisticated borrowers paying competitive, regulated interest rates;
- that the arguments advanced for why interest is unjust, exploitative and forbidden, do not "hold up",
  - and can seldom be backed up by any studies or in depth research on the subject because so few have been done—the orthodox usually talking about injustice only in their polemical arguments,
- that attempts to replace interest with an Islamic banking system based on profit and risk sharing have not been successful,
  - thanks to practical problems such as dealing with inflation, the time value of money, "information asymmetry", additional costs; which have led
  - profit and loss sharing itself to become a minor player,
  - while the backbone of the system (debt-like instruments (Note: also called "Asset-backed Financing" or credit sales-based financing) such as murabaha) have used hiyal (legal stratagem) to get around religious requirements until they resemble conventional banking in most everything besides the terminology they use;
  - and that promises made for this system—such as that it would fund long-term economic development and help low-income small traders—have not been fulfilled;
- and that ultimately the campaign against bank interest can best be explained not by scriptural-based argument, but by a need to create a complete and separate Islamic realm —

with its own financial sector—by which Muslims can strengthen their identity and avoid lapsing into being "partial Muslims".

=== Injustice of fixed return ===
The (alleged) injustice of fixed return and its (alleged) lack of risk, has been attacked by Ismail Ozsoy, M.N. Siddiqi, and M. Hameedullah. Ismail Ozsoy defines interest as riba and as "an unearned or unequally distributed income." He argues that both those who pay and receive interest are sinful and behaving unjustly because the interest rate is "fixed at the very beginning, but it is impossible to predict the outcome of the business at which the loan is used, profit or loss, or how much either would be." Ozsoy states that his argument is supported by Quran 2:275-280.

Mohammad Nejatullah Siddiqi argues that charging interest on loans—whether intended for consumption or production—is forbidden exploitation. If a loan is to buy consumer goods, those who have wealth should assist those without and not charge any increment above principal. If a business borrows to invest in plant or equipment, a guaranteed return on capital is unjust because there is no sharing of profits between entrepreneur and financier, the borrower is "obliged to pay to the bank an extra amount"—i.e. interest.

M. Hameedullah and M. Ayub also argues that interest is unjust because the borrower of collateralized loans bears risk but (they believe) the lender does not, since the lenders can keep collateral if the borrower defaults, which (they believe) violates the Islamic principle that reward should require taking/being liable for risks.

Abul A'la Maududi also believed return on an investment other than profit sharing is unjust. He preached that the interest-charging lender will increase interest rates "in direct proportion" to the borrower's "misery and the extent of his need, ... if the child of a starving man is dying of illness, the money-lender will not deem an interest rate of 400 or 500% as unduly harsh."

Defending the justice of a "fixed" return, M.O. Farooq asks if lenders aren't "renting out" the purchasing power of their capital for the length of the loan and due interest as a form of rent much as any landlord, rental agency, or other temporary provider of something valuable/useful. M.A. Khan asks why fixed rent and fixed wages are not equally unjust despite not being forbidden by orthodox scholars. (While some Islamist thinkers have promoted the idea that 'labor owned firms would express the spirit of Islam better' than conventional ones, (Note: Zaman mentions the argument of Zamir Iqbal and Mirakhor) there is no movement to restrict businesses to profit-sharing payment for employees or even much debate on the issue.) Farooq notes that in the modern world banks compete with other lenders and subject to government regulation. Predatory lending does exist—from payday lenders, and those lending at high and variable rates. These "may be covered by riba and thus Islamically prohibited," but this is hardly the same as declaring all interest riba.

Another argument against the idea that charging interest on loans exploits entrepreneurs, is that availability of capital for a modern business endeavour is one factor among many that lead to success or failure. The entrepreneur/business management involves in multiple elements—product design, production, marketing, sales, distribution, employee management and motivation, etc. Having provided its share in the process, why should financiers suffer part of the losses (if there are any) that are beyond their control; or be rewarded with profits (if there are any) that they had so little to do with? In answer to the idea that collecting interest on a business loan when the business has gone insolvent is unjust, M.A. Khan replies that in the overwhelming majority of cases both banks and lenders benefit from loans and asks if it is sensible to let the small fraction of bankruptcies dictate how finance is structured.

Feisal Khan points out that contrary to the orthodox view that collateralized loans are risk free, the 2008 subprime mortgage crisis has shown that "even AAA-rated collateral is often insufficient to ward off lender losses".

M.A. Khan cites rates of profits of business enterprises from developed countries over several decades, which were "consistently" higher by "several multiples" than the rates of interest, (Note: "Toutounchian (2009: 126) has provided data for the G-7, France, Italy and Canada for 19 years and for the US, Japan, Germany and the UK for 29 years. The data show that the rates of profits over these periods in these countries have been consistently higher by several multiples of the rates of interest. It means that business enterprises, in general, experience profit from their operations. ...") a reflection of capital markets compensating the greater risk of equities with greater returns (on average), and safer fixed income investment with lower returns. Fixed income accounts also provide a service for those with fixed and modest income, critics argue, and for people who need ready access to cash (that less liquid profit-making investments can't provide) but want to "put their money to work". Large, sophisticated enterprises can hardly be considered victims of exploitation when they borrow funds that originate in accounts of small savers.

Concerning the motive of fighting injustice and exploitation, M.A. Khan complains that the orthodox have never bothered to define exactly what they mean by exploitation or done the research to substantiate their claim that all interest exploits. M.O. Farooq notes that orthodox supporters frequently invoke exploitation and injustice in their polemical arguments but ignore it in studies or in depth works. (Note: Farooq complains that one "rather comprehensive bibliography of Islamic economics, finance and banking", Muslim Economic Thinking: A Survey of Contemporary Literature, by M.N'.Siddiqi, "includes 700 entries under 51 subcategories over 115 pages", but "not a single citation for exploitation or injustice", or mention in the index (The 75 page introductory text includes a two-page section on "Goals of the System" which includes mentions of "economic well-being", "sufficiency and peace", "provision of ease and convenience", "optimisation", "spiritual needs", " but not "justice" or ending "exploitation". Nor is there anything in another 221 page list of annotated sources from 1983 by M.A. Khan) Farooq further argues that in the real world profit, in contrast with interest, is as much exploitative, if not more. In a separate work, he illuminates the importance of rent-seeking in the modern world that is more widespread and with far greater consequence than interest. Farooq and others (e.g. Izzud-Din Pal and Yoginder Sikand) complain that the pursuit of justice has not been made the "underlying reason" in defining riba by jurists. (See above.)

=== Vice and corruption ===
Among those arguing that interest has a corrupting influence on society are Muhammad N. Siddiqi, Yusuf al-Qaradawi, medieval jurist Fakhr al-Din al-Razi, Abul A'la Maududi.

Interest "corrupts" society and "demeans and diminishes human personality" according to M.N. Siddiqi. Those who earn income from interest will not have to work, leading to the interest drawers' contempt for work and depriving others of the benefits of the interest drawers' industry and efforts, according to Yusuf al-Qaradawi. Interest brings an end of "mutual sympathy, human goodliness, and obligation", according to Imam Fakhr al-Din al Razi.

Maududi holds that interest "develops miserliness, selfishness, callousness, inhumanity". Ibn Rushd argued the rationale for prohibition relates to the possibilities of cheating that exists in riba, which is clearly visible in riba fadl.

Non-Orthodox M.O. Farooq replies by asking why Siddiqi does not even attempt to provide evidence for how charging interest leads to social and personal corruption, noting there is no connection between levels of corruption as determined by monitors such as Transparency International and the use of interest-bearing loans. Farooq answers the charge that interest leads to sloth by stating that matching the savings of savers/depositors with the capital needs of borrowers is an economically useful and competitive function, and that in the present day many savers are retired elderly of modest means for whom it would be foolish to take risks with their life savings, and who pay for this caution with smaller returns. Another non-orthodox critic, Faisal Khan, argues that while complaints of lenders being wealthy and predatory may well have been valid in the 12th Century of al-Razi, or among the North Indian peasantry that Maududi knew (who borrowed from the bania Hindu merchants who sometimes serve as money lenders), it "is hardly an accurate description" of the effects of a "modern conventional banking/financial system".

Taqi Usmani, maintains that investors/savers desire for fixed income investments/accounts is the result of an unnatural expectation of no risk of loss, brought about by the separation of finance "from normal trade activities" in capitalist banking—normal trade activities of course resulting in losses from time to time. Once people understand this they will invest in Islamic finance.

=== Inequality ===
Among those who believe that interest bearing loans favor the rich and exploit the poor are M.U. Chapra, Taqi Usmani, Al-Qaradawi, Abul A'la Maududi, Taji al-Din and Monzer Kahf, Fakhr al-Din al-Razi, and Ghulam Ahmed Pervez. (Note: Pervez was concerned not only with interest on loans, but also excessive prices and all forms of profit on capital rather than "contributions and efforts". He stated, "In the Divine system every citizen works to full capacity and happily keeps a minimum for him/herself whilst giving most of it to society.") Many (such as Taji al-Din, Fakhr al-Din al-Razi and Al-Qaradawi), express concern over rich lenders exploiting or refusing to lend to poorer borrowers following the traditional orthodox theme of a "vicious rentier class that thrives on the misery of the poor" perpetuating "a system designed to enrich the few at the expense of the many. (Note: Arguing against the theme that "lenders are rich and borrowers are poor", M.O. Farooq points out that at least in one large, developed country — the USA — ownership of bank deposits (the source of the capital used for bank loans) comes disproportionately from high income earners, but not as much as the ownership of (large) companies (which are often borrowers of bank loans). Income distribution and asset ownership statistics for 2001 show that the top earning 10% owned 84.5% of stock/mutual fund investments, but only 56.2% of bank deposits.) However Taqi Usmani expresses concern about rich borrowers who borrow "huge" amounts for "their huge profitable projects" and exploit lenders by only paying interest and not sharing their profits. (Elsewhere he states that "the intrinsic nature" of interest and not the "financial position of the parties" make loans charging interest invalid.)

Taji al-Din and Monzer Kahf argues that charging interest on loans restricts the circulation of wealth to those who already have it, since lenders do not provide loans to those who are unable to repay them. This (he believes) is forbidden by the Quran and results in an increase the divide between the rich and poor. Chapra notes that since banks are primarily interested in collateral to secure loans rather than the profitability of what the borrower/entrepreneur is seeking capital for, banks will finance rich borrowers with collateral rather than small borrowers with good ideas. Abul A'la Maududi calls interest "the greatest instrument by ... which the capitalist tries to concentrate in his hands the economic resources of the community", proclaiming "there is hardly a country in the world in which money-lenders and banks are not sucking the blood of poor labouring classes, farmers and low-income groups".

M.A. Khan replies that these difficulties would not be solved by Islamic banking, firstly because "no business firm will extend credit to a customer until it is satisfied with its credibility", and secondly because there is no evidence that Islamic banking institutions have been focusing on the potential profitability of the proposals of entrepreneurs seeking capital rather than collateral. (Note: For example, in one study of an Iranian Islamic bank from 2003 to 2004, Hans Seibel found that most of the finance was provided to big borrowers.) Overall, Khan writes, there is simply "no significant and rigorously argued study, of either Muslim or non-Muslim countries, showing that interest is causing or contributing to inequalities of income and wealth."

=== General economic harm ===
Among the claims that interest plays a negative role in the economy include that it squeezes out productive investment, encourages speculation, creates credit bubbles, fuels inflation, instability, unemployment, depressions and imperialism.

Umer Chapra writes that by providing "easy access to credit for unproductive purposes", interest "squeezes the availability of resources for need fulfilment", squelching job creation. Maududi states that productive investment is withheld when enterprise seeking investment cannot yield a profit equal to the "prevailing rate of interest".

Mohammad Abdul Mannan writes that eliminating interest would follow the cooperative norm of the Quran, and stimulate job creation and economic vitality.

M.A. Khan replies that the harm created by interest cannot be that severe as interest-based finance is "deeply entrenched" in the developed countries of the OECD, where per capita income is quite high and the percentage of poor people relatively low. M.O. Farooq notes that the countries that have gone in an "'interest-free' direction" are "hardly examples of greater economic stability."

On the issue of over-indebtedness and instability, Chapra also argues that the interest-based system and its reliance on collateral leads to excessive levels of debt, which leads to economic instability. Islamic finance would mean greater financial discipline than debt-based financing because it is tied to real assets. This discipline would mean greater economic stability. Mirakhor and Krichene argue that interest charges on debts lead to the creation of a secondary market for debt. This leads to debt changing hands, multiple layers of it being created, and the generation of credit bubbles whose inevitable bursting destabilizes the economy. M.T. Usmani insists interest-based financing may "fuel inflation" since it "does not necessarily" finance the creation of real assets" (its financing not tied to real assets), and may increase the supply of money without increasing products to match it. He cites a number of non-Muslim economists criticizing capitalist financial system for its propensity towards financial speculation, over-indebtedness, misallocation of lending capital. (Although their solutions its problems do not include banning all interest on loans.) Another way in which interest is alleged to "lend itself to speculation" is the (alleged) practice of borrowing at low rates to lend at higher ones. This (allegedly) disrupts "trade cycles" and interferes with economic planning and would be remedied by banning interest charges. Chapra also argues that "the erratic behaviour of interest rates" has caused "three decades" of "turbulence in the financial markets", citing a Nobel Laureate in economics, Milton Friedman.

Islamist leader Abul A'la Maududi—who was not an economist but has been credited with laying "down the foundations for development "of Islamic economics—preaches that interest (along with the lack of zakat tax on savings) prevents economic progress and prosperity by rewarding savings and capital formation (the common idea that these things help economic development being a "deception"). When people are not in "the habit of spending all the wealth they earn" they consume less, which decreases employment, which leads to still less consumption, creating a downward spiral leading finally "to the destruction of the whole society as every learned economist knows."

Entrepreneurial profit and wages should be the only source of income in society. Siddiqi and Ganameh cite a hadith of "income devolved on liability" in this context.

In reply, M.A. Khan argues

- that the effective elimination of interest on loans for an extended period in the world's third largest economy (i.e. Japan, which lowered prime rates to 0.01% from about 2001 to 2006 in an attempt to stimulate its economy) failed to bring that country economic stability or prosperity;
- that a secondary market for financial instruments (which "unties" finance from real assets) "is a real, live need" of finance, even if it may pose a risk of speculation. The "alternative instruments of finance such as sukuk and other Islamic bonds would also require a secondary market." And in fact there have been "efforts to create" these markets for Islamic financial instruments, but the need to follow the ideology of contemporary Islamic finance means that the markets "have ended up in a host of ruses, compromises and stratagems".

While Khan admits that a banking system based on the two modes of (1) current account deposits backed by 100% reserve and (2) profit and loss sharing accounts, would doubtless be more stable than conventional banking, this "has limited practical application"—limited to that small niche of Islamic banking that actually uses profit and loss sharing.

In reply to Chapra's citing of Western economist Milton Friedman, M.O. Farooq notes that the monetarist economists such as Friedman blame interventionist monetary policy in general rather than interest charges for the instability, and when asked specifically about any economic danger from interest charges Friedman himself stated that the work Chapra quoted did "not provide any support whatsoever for the zero interest doctrine" and that he (Friedman) did "not believe there is any merit to the argument that an interest-free economy might contribute toward greater economic stability. I believe indeed it would have the opposite effect."

=== Accumulation of third world debt ===
Usmani and other orthodoxists believe that the burden of foreign debt incurred by developing countries (including many Muslim countries) from loans by developed countries and institutions like the IMF, is an illustration of the curse of interest. Usmani quotes a number of non-Muslim sources, (Note: Susan George, Fabrizio Sabelli, Cheryl Payer, James Robertson, Jaques B. Gelinas) stating that this debt service exceeds "resource flows to developing countries", and is still growing, has brought "structural adjustment" and "austerity programs", leading to "massive unemployment, falling real incomes, pernicious inflation, increased imports, ... denial of basic needs, severe hardship and deindustrialization", etc., and can be compared to indentured labor where the worker is "permanently indentured through his debt to the employer". (Usmani suggests the problem might be remedied with Islamic modes of financing, and that "assets-related loans" could be converted into "leasing arrangement[s]".)

M.A. Khan agrees that the debt burden has created considerable hardship, but should be blamed on "mismanagement, fraud and corruption" in the misuse of borrowed funds, rather than interest charges. If interest was to blame, Islamic financing would not be a solution (Khan argues), since it also involves costs (termed "profits" or "fees" rather than interest) to those in the developing world seeking capital.

=== Alternatives to interest ===
==== Nature of interest-free finance ====
A new riba/interest free financial system would insure that no "increased amount was charged on the principal amount of a debt", as Usmani preached, the "Holy Prophet [Muhammad] ... has left no ambiguity in the fact that the creditors will be entitled to get back only the principal and will not be able to charge even a penny over and above the principal amount".

Some of those promoting or writing about interest-free banking have posed zero-interest loans (and saving accounts) as an Islamic alternative to the interest-bearing loans/accounts of conventional banking. Muhammad Siddiqi reassured policy makers that interest-free accounts paying no return to savers would not mean a significant reduction in savings because savings is mainly a function of the income of the savers rather than their expectation of any return. Mawdudi promised that zero return loans would allow the flourishing production of what was socially useful but which generated only a small return. On the other side, skeptical economist Maha-Hanaan Balala questioned how creditors would ever extend interest-free loans considering "the opportunity cost, erosion of value through inflation, risk of default by debtors"; and Fazl al-Rahman argued that an interest rate serves as a price for financing, limiting demand for it by borrowers, so that finance markets are not faced with limited supply and infinite demand.

However, according to Taqi Usmani, emphasis on zero return was misguided.

People not conversant with the principles of Shari'ah and its economic philosophy sometimes believe that abolishing interest from the banks and financial institutions would make them charitable, rather than commercial, concerns which offer financial services without a return. Obviously, this is totally a wrong assumption. According to Shari'ah, interest free loans are meant for cooperative and charitable activities, and not normally for commercial transactions ... .

Another observer (M.A. Khan) has reported "a consensus" among Muslim economists that Islamic finance for commercial transactions "would not be free", but would have some kind of "cost" other than interest. (Charitable, interest/return-free loans are known as Qardhul Hasan in Islam.)

==== Growth of alternative (Islamic banking) industry ====
As the Islamic revival blossomed in the last half of the 20th century, this new financial system began to be developed. By the late 20th century a number of Islamic banks formed to apply riba/interest-free principles to private or semi-private commercial institutions within the Muslim community, In the 1980s the Pakistan regime of General Muhammad Zia ul-Haq condemned the "curse of interest" and promised to eliminate it. By 2014 around $2 trillion in banking assets were "sharia-compliant", (approximately 1% of total world banking assets). This industry was concentrated in the Gulf Cooperation Council (GCC) countries, Iran, and Malaysia.

==== Modes ====
Islamic banking replaced riba/interest with accounts paying

- zero return on deposits: "current accounts" offered for safe keeping of depositor funds with no return added to the amount deposited (Note: "Four different methods of operating saving accounts by Islamic banks have emerged: [one is] (i) accepting saving deposits on the principle of al wadia requesting the depositors to give the bank permission to use the funds at its own risk, but guaranteeing full return of the deposits and sharing any profits voluntarily".) (Note: current accounts are offered, for example, by alrayanbank.co.uk;) (In practice these deposits often include a Hibah (literally "gift"), in the form of prizes, exemptions, etc., to compete with interest return of conventional banking current accounts.)
- a return varying according to the success of the project(s) the bank financed: for commercial finance the primary mode (in theory) of Islamic finance—called profit and loss sharing—would replace interest with risk sharing between the investor, the banker and the entrepreneur of the project being financed, much like venture capital financing. One form of profit and loss sharing is mudarabah finance, where the bank would act as the capital partner in a back-to-back mudarabah contract with the depositor on one side and the entrepreneur on the other side. As the "loan" was repaid, the financier (rabb-ul-mal) would collects some agreed upon percentage of the profits (or deducts if there are losses) along with the "principal" from the user of capital (mudarib);
- fixed return: like interest but differing (in theory) by limiting finance to a specific sale. murabaha (credit sale) was the principal form of this type of "Asset-backed" or "trading-based" mode of financing (also used are Ijara, Istisna, were some others) and they were to supplement the profit and loss sharing models. As Islamic finance grew, it became clear Murabahah was not a supplement to profit and loss sharing, but the mode used in about 80% of Islamic lending. (Note: according to one 2014 estimate.) (Explanation for this include that the structure and results of Murabahah were more familiar to bankers, and that profit and loss sharing turned out to be far more risky and costly than proponents had hoped.)

==== Murabaha and trade-based mode of finance ====
The similarity between credit sales and conventional non-Islamic ("ribawi") loans has been noted (some calling murabaha a "semantic work-around" for interest charging loans), necessary because businesses "cannot survive where cash and credit prices are equal", and urges that bank interest not be judged haram. Critics complained that in the eyes of standard accounting practices and truth-in-lending regulations there is no distinction between (for example) getting 90 days credit on a Rs10000 (cash price) product and paying an extra Rs500 (allowed), or taking out a 90-day loan of Rs10000 that charges interest totaling Rs500 (forbidden). (Note: "Indeed, truth-in-lending regulations in the United States force Islamic and conventional financiers to report the implicit interest rates they charge their customers in such financing arrangements.")

Orthodox writers (such as Monzer Kahf) have defended the distinction stating attaching commodities to money in finance prevents money from being used for speculative purposes.

(see: Quran and credit sales and late payment)

Usmani insists that the phrase "God has permitted trade..." from Quranic verse 2:275, refers to credit sales such as murabaha, so that "taking the time of payment into consideration" in paying more for a product/commodity, does not come "within the ambit of interest", i.e. riba. Paying more for credit when buying a product does not violate sharia law—the reasoning goes—because it is "an exchange of commodities for money", while a bank loan is "an exchange of money for money" and forbidden unless interest is zero. The buyer in a credit sale is paying not "principal" and "interest", but "cost" and "profit".

Other orthodox scholars (A.I. Qureshi, M.A. El-Gamal), instead of giving a rationale, declare that the difference is knowable only to God, something humans must obey without understanding.

The permissibility of the first [trade] and the prohibition of the second [usury/interest] are both quite clear and unequivocal ... Why one is permitted while the other is forbidden can only be fully known by Allah and whomsoever he gave such knowledge. As a practical matter, we should know what is permitted and use it to our advantage, and what is forbidden and avoid it.

Credit sales do not follow the Islamic ideal called for by pioneers of Islamic banking of doing away with the "injustice" and exploitation of un-shared profits and losses in finance. Orthodox scholars have expressed a lack of enthusiasm for murabaha credit sales-based Islamic Banking. (The Pakistan state Council of Islamic Ideology calls it "no more than a second best solution from the viewpoint of an ideal Islamic system;" Usmani calls it a "borderline transaction with very fine lines of distinction as compared to an interest bearing loan".) According to Usmani an (orthodox) Islamically proper murabaha and other credit sale financing are only to be used

- when profit and loss sharing is impractical,
- when the transaction finances the purchase of some product or commodity by the customer,
- when that product or commodity is bought and owned by the bank (which takes the risk for it) until the customer's payment is complete, and
- when there are no additional charges for late payment.

Criticism of interest-free finance and its practices

The shortcomings of Islamic banking has been used by at least one non-orthodox critic as an arguments against equating interest with riba. According to M.O. Farooq, the "increasing need" of the Islamic banking industry "to resort to Hiyal (legal stratagem) to claim Shari'ah-compliance", is evidence that forbidding interest "is not tenable from Islamic viewpoint". Critics/skeptics complain/note

- that aside from the belying all the lofty theoretical talk of eliminating the injustice of fixed return in finance,
- in practice not only do "murabaḥah" transactions resemble loans, but most do not follow scholarly restrictions, being merely cash-flows between banks, brokers and borrowers, with no buying or selling of commodities;
- that the profit or mark-up is based on the prevailing interest rate used in haram lending by the non-Muslim world;
- that the risks taken by the financier are non-existent (being insured or covered by guarantees provided by the customer);
- that Islamic banks have "found it impractical to obey their own charters" and that they have "disguised interest under a variety of charges";
- that "the financial outlook" of Islamic Murabaha financing and conventional interest-charging financing is "the same", as is most everything else besides the terminology used.

(At least one supporter (Khalid Zaheer) of the interest=riba formulation has not only been unenthusiastic about but opposed to trying to distinguish between credit sales and interest, simply urging Islamic bankers to show "concern for the plight" of the Muslim borrower and charge them no interest.)

==== Substitutes for other interest-based financial products and for interest in accounting and economic models ====
Other Islamic finance products replacing conventional bonds (Sukuk), insurance (Takaful), promise to avoid not only riba but Islamically forbidden concepts such as Maysir (gambling or speculation) and Gharar ("uncertainty" or "ambiguity").

Replacements have been suggested for the use of a bank (interest) rate for monetary policy. Siddiqi suggests two variables that can alternatively be used:

1) mark-up in sales with deferred payment and
2) ratios used in sharing modes of finance.

These ratios could be used to manipulate rates of profit (of Islamic finance). They could be determined through market forces or set by governments for the public interest, and as of the early 1980s this has been legislated in Sudan and Pakistan, according to Siddiqi. Another source (Bijan Bidabad) suggests that "some public equity-based instrument" such as "Rastin Swap Bonds (RSBs)" be used for "non-usury open market operations".

In modern economic theory many of the important models use interest as a key element, and in accounting interest rates are used to evaluate projects and investments. Islamic economics looks to find alternative variables and parameters—one suggestion has been for Tobin's q to replace Interest (I). As a tool for comparing projects with countries where the interest rate is operated, however, it is argued that a profit rate could be used.

=== Non-orthodox approach ===
The non-orthodox position emphasizes the difference between bank interest and the riba of the Quran (sometimes arguing that contemporary "bank Interest" is a new financial technology not covered by classical fiqh), and the importance of moral and practical aspects in determining what is riba.

In addition to the defence of the use of bank interest as Islamically permissible and not the cause of harm to economic prosperity, the poor, or society in general, the non-orthodox (primarily M.O. Farooq, and M.A. Khan) argue that several issues—the time value of money, dealing with inflation, early or delinquent loan payment—make a ban on all interest problematic, and that the "Islamic concept of money" used to defend the ban is itself problematic.

==== Government-affiliated ulama ====
A number of the high level jurists affiliated in some way with Muslim-majority governments have opposed a ban on all interest. Egyptian President Anwar Sadat obtained a fatwa from the Sheikh of al-Azhar ruled that interest-bearing treasury bonds were consistent with Islamic law. More recently the mufti of Egypt, Dr. Muhammad Sayyid Tantawy, issued several fatawa permitting bank interest in 1991. In 1997 Shaykh Nasr Farid Wasil (Grand Mufti of Dar al-Ifta al-Misriyyah at the time) also declared bank interest permissible provided the money was invested in halal avenues: "there is no such thing as an Islamic or non-Islamic bank. So let us stop this controversy about bank interest." Dr Abd-al-Munim Al-Nimr, an ex-minister of 'Awqaf in Egypt, publicly stated that banking interest cannot be considered riba. This has been explained as in keeping with the tendency for rulers to get the fatwas they want on "key policy issues" from "official" ulama "whose task it is to legitimize" rulers' policies. (Historians note the practice is not new and that jurists legitimized interest for awqaf (religious endowments) during the late period of the Ottoman rule (as mentioned above).

==== Modernist position ====
In addition to service to government, another motivation of jurists opposing the formulation interest=riba has been the arguments of Islamic Modernism of the 20th century Modernist jurists, mentioned above. (Other Modernists interpreters of riba include those on the India-Pakistan subcontinent including: Ja'afar Shah Phulwarai, Tamanna Imadi, Rafiullah Shihab, Yaqub Shah, Abdul Ghafur Muslim, Syed Ahmad, Aqdas Ali Kazmi, and Abdullah Saeed.)

Islamic Modernists tend to "emphasize the moral aspect of the prohibition of riba, and argue that the rationale for this prohibition as formulated in al-Qur'an was injustice and hardship." Modernists believe pre-Islamic lending practices in Makka constituted riba and are much different from and more problematic than contemporary bank lending, which do not involve riba, according to sources such as M.A. Khan and The Encyclopedia of Islam and the Muslim World. (Note: According to two scholars, E. Glaeser and J. Scheinkman, "ancient usury laws, which forbade all interest on loans", constituted a "form of a priori social insurance. In societies with pervasive poverty, the cooperative charitable lending rule provides transfers from fortunate individuals born with wealth to those less fortunate.")

Makkan lending (Riba al-jahiliya) involved high interest rates charged by rich money lenders to poor customers who borrowed for purposes of consumption, and led to the accumulation of large debts and often financial slavery. In contrast, most money loaned in contemporary society is for commercial purposes and investment, transacted between sophisticated parties, offering/paying interest rates determined and kept low by a competitive and regulated market—most of these features not in existence when the Quran was revealed. Furthermore, contemporary bankruptcy laws "protect borrowers against the horrors once produced by riba".

They also advance the economic argument that "the goal of eradicating interest is both misguided and unfeasible," because interest is "indispensable to any complex economy".

==== Harm to borrower ====
Islamic Modernist scholar such as Fazlur Rahman Malik, Muhammad Asad, Sa'id al-Najjar, Sayyid Tantawi, differ from the orthodox interpreters in arguing that interest is not riba unless it involves exploitation of the needy. They differentiate between various forms of interest charges advocating the lawfulness of some and rejecting others.

Abd-al-Munim Al-Nimr, also argues that riba must involve harm to the debtor. In his fatawa permitting bank interest and declaring it non-riba, Muhammad Sayyid Tantawy argued it makes little sense to suggest that modest saving account holders are exploiting sophisticated multibillion-dollar banks that pay them the interest on their accounts. Fixed return or "determination of the profit in advance is done for the sake of the owner of the capital (that is the depositor) and is done to prevent a dispute between him and the bank," rather than to exploit.

Lawyer and Islamic scholar Kemal A. Faruki, complained that much time and energy were spent in Pakistan on "learned discussions on riba" and "doubtful distinctions between `interest` and `guaranteed profits`" in the banking system, while a far more serious problem affecting the poor was ignored:

usury perpetrated on the illiterate and the poor by soodkhuris (lit. 'devourers of usury'). These officially registered moneylenders under the Moneylenders Act are permitted to lend at not more than 1% below the State Bank rate. In fact they are Mafia-like individuals who charge interest as high as 60% per annum collected ruthlessly in monthly installments and refuse to accept repayment of the principal sum indefinitely. Their tactics include intimidation and force.

==== Practicality ====
Economic arguments that bank interest is needed for efficient allocation of resources and economic development, also mean that it serves the public interest. Because public interest (Maslaha), is one of the bases of divine law (ranking below other sources: Quran, Sunnah, ijma' (scholarly consensus) and qiyas (analogy)) this may exempt bank interest from charges of being haram and riba.

Turkish-American economist and Islamic Studies scholar Timur Kuran questions whether an economy without interest has ever existed: "As far as is known, no Muslim polity has had a genuinely interest-free economy." Feisal Khan notes that the Islamic banking industry is under criticism not just from non-orthodox who think Islam does not call for a ban on interest, but from "ultra-orthodox" who believe it has not truly excluding all forms of interest from finance. He notes complaints about the authenticity of Islamic banking from strict Muslims (Taqi Usmani has argued that the industry has "totally" neglected the "basic philosophy", undermining its own raison d'être; so that non-Muslims and the Muslim "masses" have now gotten the impression that Islamic banking is "nothing but a matter of twisting documents ....") and that in 2002—23 years after riba was first forbidden in Pakistan—the State Bank of Pakistan declared that banks and "windows" made "Islamic" in 1979 were not truly Islamic, but conventional, and that other banks (such as the Meezan Bank and Al Baraka Bank) were "full-fledged" Islamic commercial banks who would be promoted by the state bank. Despite this "rebooting", Khan states that the new, purified, full-fledged Islamic banks are the same in "form and function" as the old Islamic banks, and that eleven years later (as of 2013), use only a minuscule amount (3%) of profit and loss sharing, and make up only about 10% of the country's banking sector.

===== Reply to Modernists =====
Most of these arguments have been criticized by Islamic revivalist writers, including Siddiqi, Zarqa, Khan & Mirakhor and Chapra, and especially by Taqi Usmani's "Judgement on Interest Delivered in the Supreme Court of Pakistan".

Taqi Usmani argues that commercial, industrial and agricultural (as opposed to consumption) loans could not have been unknown to Arabs in the era of Muhammad since ahadith mention large loans and large scale caravans used by Arab traders. Arabs of Muhammad's era also had "constant business relations" with the adjacent Byzantine province of Syria (Arabs used its silver dirhams and gold dinars for currency) where interest bearing loans were so widespread that a separate law was enforced to fix their rate of interest. He also points out that there are a number of references to "all" riba being forbidden in ahadith, and all excess over principal being riba, but no mention of some smaller amount of interest being permissible.

=== Time value of money ===
One concept instrumental in explaining (and defending) the justice of charging interest on loans is the time value of money—the idea that there is greater benefit in possessing money in the present rather than the future. The concept justifies the idea that later payment should be discounted and savers/investors/lenders be compensated for deferring the benefits of consumption, or—as mentioned above (see: Injustice of fixed return)—compensated for "renting out" the purchasing power of their capital, much as any rental agency providing something valuable/useful is paid rent.

As such, some Islamic finance supporters have attacked the idea of time value. (Note: El-Gamal states "There is a very large number of papers in Islamic Economics which addressed the question whether or not Islam recognizes a time value of money, many of which come to the negative answer.", El-Gamal then gives as an example Mawdudi and al-Sadr. Taqi Usmani also states: "[I]n Shari'ah, there is no concept of time value of money.") Fahim Khan of the Islamic Research and Training Institute in Saudi Arabia states that the prohibition of interest "can be considered" a "sort of a denial of time value of money". Maududi has called the difference "between the psychological values of the present and the future ... nothing but an illusion", and disproven by the fact that few people "spend all their wealth on present pleasure and enjoyment." Taqi Usmai has declared unequivocally that "in Shariah there is no concept of time value of money".

Irfan argues that the value of money diminishes very little over time because some consumption—such as eating—can only be done over time. Furthermore, discounting for time may lead to negative outcomes such as unsustainable agricultural production with planting and grazing that causes desertification and erosion, since these bad outcomes occur in the discounted future. However, Islamic banking also calls for rewarding delayed gratification in the form of "return on investment" and the sale of goods on credit (endorsed by early jurists such as Muhammad al-Shaybani).

Most orthodox Islamic scholars and economists have taken a middle path—insisting that a rate of discount of money over time is an invalid concept if the rate is interest on a loan, but valid if the rate is return on capital from Murabaha or other Islamic contracts. Critic Farooq complains that this rationalization is contradictory, and amounts to denying time value in theory while embracing it in practice, and that the accepting of the theory in practice explains the large (and successful) move of non-Islamic western banks into Islamic banking.

=== Islamic concept of money ===
Answers to the argument (of economists such as Farooq) that lenders of money are due some kind of rent-like compensation; and to the question of why charging extra to finance a purchase (in, for example, murabaha Islamic finance) is allowed, but in lending cash it is riba, (Note: An example of someone who does not believe in the difference is Abdullah Saeed, who states, "Murabaha finance and the higher credit price involved therein has clearly shown that there is a value of time in murabaha based finance, which leads, albeit indirectly, to the acceptance of the time value of money. It has been conveniently ignored that accepting the time value of money logically leads to the acceptance of interest.) can be found (supporters believe) in the "Islamic concept of money".

Orthodox scholars, such as M.U. Chapra and M.T. Usmani, have written that money can only be a "medium of exchange" and must not be treated as an "asset or commodity". Trading a commodity/asset, or paying a fee for its use is right and sensible (they argue), but trading or renting a medium of exchange is wrong, because money is "unproductive" has "no intrinsic utility". This being the case, no return for the use of money can be justified, and explains (at least in part) why it is riba.

Usmani quotes condemnations of speculation by various Western sources (Note: According to Humayun Dar and John Presley, there can be found writings in Western economic literature "which blame interest rates and associated bank credit expansions and contractions for many of the economic evils of our time," and which make up "almost a 'tradition'", but are "not mainstream".) and the writings of the celebrated medieval Islamic scholar Al-Ghazzali that money was made to facilitate trade and should never be hoarded or used to charge interest.

In response, M.A. Khan questions

- whether the distinction between asset and medium of exchange proceeds from a need "to prove that all types of interest are unfair", rather than from Islam;
- how money can be a medium of exchange but not an asset, asking what "the justification for charging" zakat (the Islamic religious tax) on money is "if money is not a store of value";
- how cash balances are to be entered in modern business accounting if not as assets;
- if there is any good way for enforcers of Islamic law to differentiate between productive trading and the speculation which is forbidden by this definition.

=== Early payment of debt ===
The opposite of credit sales—i.e., higher charge for deferred payment—is reduced charges for early payment, and is hard to justify without an acknowledgment of the time value of money and the validity of interest on loans, according to some (such as M.A. Khan).

Reduction of debt for early payment is considered haram by the four Sunni schools of jurisprudence (Hanafi, Maliki, Shafi'i, Hanbali), but whether there is a consensus of Islamic jurists is unclear. According to Ridha Saadullah, such reductions have

been permitted by some companions of the Prophet and some of their followers. This position has been advanced by Ibn Taymiyya and Ibn al-Qayyim, and it has, more recently, been adopted by the Islamic Fiqh Academy of the OIC. The Academy decided that `reduction of a deferred debt in order to accelerate its repayment, whether at the request of the debtor or the creditor is permissible under Shariah. It does not constitute forbidden riba if it is not agreed upon in advance and as long as the creditor-debtor relationship remains bilateral. ...

=== Inflation ===
Whether or not compensation to lenders for the erosion of the value of the funds from inflation is allowed (and how to provide that compensation in a way that is not considered riba), has also been called a problem "vexing" Islamic scholars, since finance for businesses will not be forthcoming if a lender loses money by lending.

Volume 1 of Investment Laws in Muslim Countries Handbook, states "an interest rate that did not exceed the rate of inflation was not riba according to classical Islamic jurists." Suggestions to solve the problem include indexing loans or denominating loans "in terms of a commodity" such as gold, and doing further research to find an answer.

However, many scholars believe indexing is a type of riba] and that it encourages inflation. Others state that using "interest to neutralise inflation would be tantamount to using a bigger 'evil' [interest] to fight a smaller one [inflation].

=== Delinquent payments/Defaults ===
While in conventional finance late payments/delinquent loans are discouraged by interest that accumulates while the loan is delinquent, the price for credit payments can "never be increased" no matter how late the lender/buyer is in repaying (according to Usmani) because late fees are payment "against money", which violates the principal that credit payments must be "against commodity and not against money".

Prohibition against late fees has led to the control and management of delinquent accounts becoming "one of the vexing problems" in Islamic finance, according to M.A. Khan. According to Ibrahim Warde,

Islamic banks face a serious problem with late payments, not to speak of outright defaults, since some people take advantage of every dilatory legal and regal and religious device ... In most Islamic countries, various forms of penalties and late fees have been established, only to be outlawed or considered unenforceable. Late fees in particular have been assimilated to riba. As a result, `debtors know that they can pay Islamic banks last since doing so involves no cost`

Warde also complains that

"Many businessmen who had borrowed large amounts of money over long periods of time seized the opportunity of Islamicization to do away with accumulated interest of their debt, by repaying only the principal—usually a puny sum when years of double-digit inflation were taken into consideration.

== Riba al-fadl ==
While riba an-nasiya=interest is a major issue among Islamist/revivalist preachers, writers and economists, and forms the basis of Islamic Banking, another type of riba—what jurists call riba al-fadl ("surplus riba") is also forbidden by orthodox jurists. Riba al-fadl does not involve paying back over time but instead the trading of different quantities of the same commodity (gold, silver, wheat, barley, date, or salt), typically because the quality of the smaller quantity is superior.

Because riba al-fadl involves barter, and barter is much less common than it was in early Meccan society, riba al-fadl is of much less interest nowadays than riba an-nasiya. It is also considered (at least by some sources) a form of riba prohibited by the Sunnah rather than the Quran. (Note: According to one source (Pakistani attorney Riazul Hasan Gilani), it is discouraged (makrooh) but not forbidden (haram), relaxed in cases of genuine need, and exempts non-Muslims whatever the need or lack of it.) Taqi Usmani states that Riba al-fadl was developed by Muhammad and so was not part of pre-Islamic jahiliya.

According to the Zahiri school and early scholars like Tawus ibn Kaysan and Qatadah, Riba on hand-to-hand exchanges of gold, silver, dates, salt, wheat and barley are prohibited by Muhammad's injunction, but analogical reasoning is not used to extend that injunction to other agricultural produce as is the case with other schools. In his treatise "The Removal of Blames from the Great Imams", classical scholar Ibn Taymiyya acknowledges the difference of opinion ( khilaf ) amongst the scholars on the prohibition of riba al-fadl. Similarly, his student Ibn Qayyim distinguished between riba al-nasi'ah and riba al-fadl, maintaining that rib al-nasi'ah was prohibited by Qur'an and Sunnah definitively while the latter was only prohibited in order to stop the charging of interest. According to him, the prohibition of riba al-fadl was less severe and it could be allowed in dire need or greater public interest (maslaha). Hence under a compelling need, an item may be sold with delay in return for dirhams or for another weighed substance despite implicating riba al-nasi'ah. In addition, Ibn Qayyim held that the sales of gold and silver jewelry for more than their equivalent weight in gold or silver was permissible, in consideration of workmanship and people's dire need.

Traditional Hanafi school of thought also permits a Muslim living in a warring non-Muslim country to give interest to non-Muslims with their consent (be it riba al-fadl or riba al-nasi'ah), but it is forbidden to take interest from them when they give at interest, that is, such a transaction is prohibited. According to another view within the Hanafi school (reported from Abu Hanifa and his student Muhammad al-Shaybani ), a Muslim living in a non-Muslim country is allowed to deal in interest with its citizens regardless of faith. In addition, some classical Hanbali jurists such as Ibn Taymiyya permitted transactions involving interest between a Muslim and non-Muslim in dar al-harb (territory of war) provided neither entered the others' territory under amaan (i.e., protection under permission to stay).

Seeking precedence from classical scholarship, post-classical scholarly skepticism of the interest=riba formulation (forming a so-called "non-orthodox" or "Non-Equivalence School") goes back to Ottoman Grand Mufti Ebussuud Efendi and includes 19th/20th century Islamic jurists, such as Muhammad Abduh, Rashid Rida, Mahmud Shaltut, Syed Ahmad Khan, Fazl al-Rahman, Muhammad Sayyid Tantawy.

=== Hadith ===
Examples of the ahadith cited in forbidding riba al-fadl—many from Sahih Bukhari—are:

Narrated Abu Said: We used to be given mixed dates (from the booty) and used to sell (barter) two Sas (of those dates) for one Sa (of good dates). The Prophet said (to us), "No (bartering of) two Sas for one Sa nor two Dirhams for one Dirham is permissible", (as that is a kind of usury). (Sahih al-Bukhari, 3:34:294)

Narrated 'Umar bin Al-Khattab: God's Apostle said, "The bartering of gold for silver is riba, (usury), except if it is from hand to hand and equal in amount, and wheat grain for wheat grain is usury except if it is from hand to hand and equal in amount, and dates for dates is usury except if it is from hand to hand and equal in amount, and barley for barley is usury except if it is from hand to hand and equal in amount". (Sahih al-Bukhari, 3:34:344)

Narrated Ibn 'Umar: Muhammad said, "The selling of wheat for wheat is riba (usury) except if it is handed from hand to hand and equal in amount. Similarly the selling of barley for barley, is Riba except if it is from hand to hand and equal in amount, and dates for dates is usury except if it is from hand to hand and equal in amount. (Sahih al-Bukhari, 3:34:379)

Narrated AbuHurayrah: Muhammad said: If anyone makes two transactions combined in one bargain, he should have the lesser of the two or it will involve usury. (Sunan Abu Daud)

Raqiub Zaman notes that when riba is described in hadith literature, it is "in the context of sales" (where riba al-fadl might apply), with "no mention of loan (qard) or debt (dayan)", (where riba an-nasiya might apply).

However, there are various contradictions and discrepancies in ahadith on riba al-fadl. Both M.O. Farooq and M.A. Khan quote a well-known hadith by Usama bin Zayd (in Sahih al-Bukhari) making a rather categorical statement that

- "there is no riba except in nasi'ah (delay)".

Farooq cites another from Sahih Muslim

- "There is no riba in hand-to-hand [spot] transactions."

Farooq quotes another scholar (Iqbal Ahmad Khan Suhail) who believes the two ahadith "demolish the self-invented castle of riba al-fadl". M.A. Khan also believes the hadith indicate that riba in a spot exchange is "ruled out". According to scholar Farhad Nomani, ahadith citing Ibn `Abbas, a companion of Muhammad, "report that there is no riba except in deferment... [of] delivery and/or payment", again questioning the existence of riba al-fadl. (Ibn Rushd also reportedly agreed that according to Ibn 'Abba, Muhammad did not accept riba al-fadl because, "there was no Riba except in credit". But according to Mahmoud A. El-Gamal, Ibn Rushd later reversed his position.)

(There are also contradictory ahadith on trading silver for gold: one stating: "... The bartering of gold for silver is Riba except if it is from hand to hand and equal in amount...", while others say: "the Prophet ... allowed us to sell gold for silver and vice versa as we wished.")

=== Application ===
Islamic jurists have traditionally interpreted the admonition of riba by the ahadith to mean that if one amount of commodity is traded for the same kind of commodity then the two items exchanged must be of the same quantity, ignoring the quality of the commodity or the labor added to it. (Although there is some question of why anyone would ever exchange equal quantities of the same quality commodity "like for like"—that the ahadith seems to call for—for example 100 kilograms of wheat for 100 kg of wheat.) If, for example, a jeweler is paid in gold bullion for a gold ornament or piece of jewelry, and charges any money for their labor, they are guilty of riba al-fadl. If someone has a 100 grams of 24 karat gold and needs 100 grams of 18 karat gold (and can only get it by trade with their gold), they must trade their 100 grams for an equal amount of that less pure gold or commit riba al-fadl.

All the schools of Islamic jurisprudence (fiqh) accept this prohibition. In more recent times, the International Institute of Islamic Economics 1999 Blueprint of Islamic financial system including strategy for elimination of riba, declared riba al-fadl forbidden under Islamic law, defining it as exchange transactions of the `same general kind` where there are `qualitative differences`. The Concise Dictionary of Islamic Terms (1979) also states that riba al-fadl is one of two kinds of riba which are "strictly forbidden by the laws of Islam".

While all the schools of fiqh agree with the prohibition, they do not agree over its rationale or whether it is restricted to the six commodities mentioned in ahadith—gold, silver, wheat, barley, date, salt—as the ahadith do not say "whether or not other commodities will assume the same status".

- Imam Abu Hanifa, of the Sunni Hanafi school of fiqh believed that the six commodities shared the common feature (`illah) of being able to be weighed or measured, so that other commodities sold by weighing or measuring were subject to the same rule.
- Imam Al-Shafi'i, of the Shafi'i school of fiqh, was of the opinion that their common feature (`llah) was that they were either eatables or were used as a universal legal tender. Thus, to him, all eatables and universal legal tenders were subject to riba al-fadl.
- For Imam Malik ibn Anas of the Maliki school the common feature of the six was that they were either food items or could be stored (i.e. were non-perishable), so in this school only food items or storable items are included in this category.

This disagreement (according to Taqi Usmani) is the part of the lament of Rashidun Caliph Umar that Muhammad did not explain the prohibition more clearly.

Criticism

Critics of this interpretation include activist Khalid Zaheer and economists M.A. Khan and Mohammad Omar Farooq. Zaheer believes that "the literature on Islamic Finance and Economics is presenting very strange applications of the concept of riba al-fadl, which are ... being applied in areas of business and finance where their application was never intended." He notes that some scholars "openly" admit they do not understand the logic of the ban on Riba al-Fadl.

Prohibition of riba al-fadl (specifically in barter of six specified commodities) is mentioned only in hadith. M.A. Khan and Farooq find the reference to riba al-fadl questionable as it makes no sense. Khan asks why anyone would ever trade equal quantities of the same kind of commodity ("like for like")—for example 100 kilograms of wheat for 100 kg of wheat—in a riba-free transaction called for by quoted ahadith. Or how "divine law" could prescribe that a jeweler—"who has spent his time and effort to convert gold into jewelry" and is taking gold as payment—not be compensated? M.A. Khan also notes that the authors of the IIIE blueprint have no objection to traders selling higher purity/quality commodity for cash and using the proceeds to buying more less purity/quality commodity, and wonders what would be accomplished by such "an ineffective and roundabout method of handling a simple exchange transaction".

Abdullah Saeed complains that the legal cause or feature (`illa) used by the schools of Islamic jurisprudence to determine what commodities were subject to riba (i.e. being able to be measured, eaten or used as legal tender) ignores reasons why a sale should be prohibited (hikmah) issues such as "the circumstances of the transaction, the parties thereto, or the importance of the commodity to the survival of society."

Mahmoud El-Gama notes that orthodox interpretation (or at least orthodox Hanafi) of riba (the basis of what he attacks as "shari'a arbitrage") distinguishes between fungible (mithli) and non-fungible (qimi) items. Thus (allegedly) fungible gold may not be traded one ounce for two, but trading one non-fungible item (such as diamonds) for two is permitted, whatever the items' market value. Thus "selling a diamond worth $10,000 today for a deferred price of $20,000 tomorrow" and immediately selling the diamond for $10,000 in cash is halal (legal) under orthodox rules of riba al-fadl—notwithstanding the fact that it would give the financier an effective rate of 100% interest. El-Gama describes this as avoiding "riba in form" while being "usurious in substance".

=== Rationale ===
According to Abdullah Saeed, "the intended meaning" of the ahadith concerning riba al-fadl "was not very clear even to many jurists", who nonetheless believed the prohibition "was to be observed and complied with ... without probing into the reasons for the prohibition." Other scholars have probed. Ibn Rushd stated that "what is targeted by the prohibition of riba is the excessive inequity it entails". Taqi Usmani asserts that Riba al-fadl was developed by Muhammad after his ban on riba to avoid "certain barter transactions might lead the people to indulge in Riba", picking out commodities that were "a medium of exchange like money".

Iqbal Suhail believes trading lesser quality foodstuffs for better quality and less quantity was forbidden because the frugality and austerity of Muhammad was offended by something like the spending resources on higher quality foodstuffs "for the sake of gratification of the palate." Others believe riba al-fadl makes little sense as a prohibited sin but does as a sort of consumer advice. Mohammed Fadel (of the faculty of law, University of Toronto) calls it a 'prudential regulation'.

Farooq suggest it may have arisen to warn Muslims that barter is usually less profitable than buying and selling separately, (Note: Farooq compares it to the recommendation given to contemporary used car buyers: "selling your old car takes more time and knowhow, but you can potentially get more money than when trading it in".) and notes several hadith where Muhammad tells a Muslim not to trade dates of different quality but never mentions riba. M.A. Khan argues that the prohibition against riba al-fadl comes not from any clear understanding of the ahadith but from an attempt to find a plausible explanation "to rationalize the ambiguity in the text".

== See also ==
Islam related

- Islamic banking and finance
- Shariah investments
- Dhimmi
- Jizya
- Zakat

Economy related

- Loans and interest in Judaism
- Terrorism financing
- Usury
- Vix pervenit

Contemporary issues

- FATF blacklist
- Terrorism financing
