= Al-Muhtadi =

14th Abbasid Caliph (r. 869–870)

al-Muhtadi المهتدي
- Khalifah; Amir al-Mu'minin
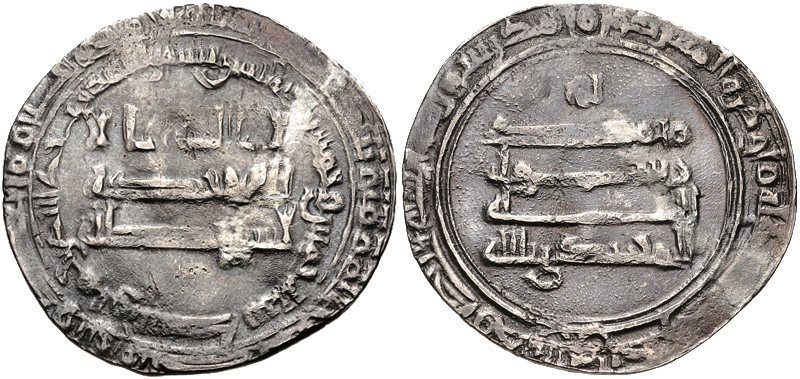
- Dirham of al-Muhtadi, minted in Wasit in 255 AH / 869 CE

14th Caliph of the Abbasid Caliphate
- Reign: 255 - 256 AH ( 11 months, 21 days ) 21/22 July 869 – 21 June 870 CE
- Predecessor: al-Mu'tazz
- Successor: al-Mu'tamid
- Born: 218 AH c. 833 CE; Baghdad, Abbasid Caliphate
- Died: 256 AH 21 June 870 CE (aged c. 37); Samarra, Abbasid Caliphate
- Burial: Samarra
- Issue: Abu Bakr
Names
- Abū Isḥāq Muḥammad ibn Hārūn al-Muhtadī bi-ʾLlāh
- Dynasty: Abbasid
- Father: al-Wathiq
- Mother: Qurb
- Religion: Sunni Islam

Abū Isḥāq Muḥammad ibn Hārūn ibn Muḥammad ibn Hārūn al-Muhtadī bi-ʾLlāh (Arabic: أبو إسحاق محمد بن هارون الواثق; 218-256 AH | 833-870 CE), better known by his regnal name al-Muhtadī bi-ʾLlāh (Arabic: المهتدي بالله, "Guided by God"), was the Caliph of the Abbasid Caliphate from July 869 to June 870, during the "Anarchy at Samarra".

== Early life ==
Family tree of the Abbasid caliphs of the ninth century

Al-Muhtadi was the son of Abbasid caliph al-Wathiq. He was born in 833. Al-Muhtadi's mother was Qurb, a Roman slave. After the death of his father, Caliph al-Wathiq (r. 842–847) in August 847, there were some officials who wanted to elect the young al-Muhtadi as caliph, but in the end, their choice fell on his uncle, al-Mutawakkil (r. 847–861). During his uncle's reign, Muhammad spend his time in the family life. As a young adult prince, he also fathered children. His notable son was Abu Bakr.

=== Background ===
His uncle, caliph al-Mutawakkil had created a plan of succession that would allow his sons to inherit the caliphate after his death; he would be succeeded first by his eldest son, Muhammad al-Muntasir, then by Muhammad al-Mu'tazz and third by Ibrahim al-Mu'ayyad.

Despite the successes of his cousin, caliph al-Mu'tazz, He could not overcome the main problem of the period: a shortage of revenue with which to pay the troops. The financial straits of the Caliphate had become evident already at his accession—the customary accession donative of ten months' pay for the troops had to be reduced to two for lack of funds—and had helped bring down the regime of his cousin al-Musta'in in Baghdad. The civil war and the ensuing general anarchy only worsened the situation, as revenue stopped coming in even from the environs of Baghdad, let alone more remote provinces. As a result, al-Mu'tazz refused to honour his agreement with Ibn Tahir in Baghdad, leaving him to provide for his own supporters; this led to unrest in the city and the rapid decline of Tahirid family. The turmoil in Baghdad was worsened by al-Mu'tazz, who in 869 dismissed Ibn Tahir's brother and successor Ubaydallah, and replaced him with his far less capable brother Sulayman. In the event, this only served to deprive the Caliph of a useful counterweight against the Samarra soldiery, and allowed the Turks to regain their former power.

=== Accession ===
By 869 the Turkic leaders Salih ibn Wasif and Ba'ikbak were again in the ascendant, and secured the removal of Ahmad ibn Isra'il. Finally, unable to meet the financial demands of the Turkic troops, in mid-July a palace coup deposed al-Mu'tazz. He was imprisoned and maltreated to such an extent that he died after three days, on 16 July 869. He was succeeded by his cousin, Muhammad with laqab al-Muhtadi.

Al-Muhtadi's cousin, Abu Ahmad Talha ibn al-Mutawakkil who was residing at the Qasr al-Dinar palace in East Baghdad. He was so popular prince and military leader that at the time of al-Mu'tazz's death in July 869, the army and the people clamoured in favour of his elevation to the caliphate, rather than al-Muhtadi (r. 869–870). Abu Ahmad Talha refused, however, and took the oath of allegiance to al-Muhtadi.

== Caliphate ==
After the deposition and murder of his cousin al-Mu'tazz (r. 866–869) on 15 July 869, the leaders of the Turkic guard chose al-Muhtadi as the new Caliph on 21/22 July. As a ruler, al-Muhtadi sought to emulate the Umayyad caliph Umar ibn Abd al-Aziz, widely considered a model Islamic ruler. He therefore lived an austere and pious life: praying in a wool garment, fasting throughout his Caliphate and allowing himself only bread, salt, oil and vinegar at sunset. As well as removing all musical instruments and singing girls from the court and made a point of presiding in person over the courts of grievances (mazalim), thus gaining the support of the common people. Combining "strength and ability", he was determined to restore the Caliph's authority and power, that had been eroded during the ongoing "Anarchy at Samarra" by the squabbles of the Turkish generals.

Al-Muhtadi faced Alid risings in the provinces, but the main threat to his power were the Turkish commanders. The dominant figure of the first months of his rule was Salih ibn Wasif, but he too failed to provide enough revenue to pay the troops. Although he executed the previous vizier, Ahmad ibn Isra'il, and his extortion of the secretaries (kuttab), his power continued to wane. His main rival, Musa ibn Bugha, used the opportunity to return from his semi-exile in Hamadhan, arriving in Samarra in December 869. There he constrained al-Muhtadi to take an oath to punish Salih for having robbed the treasures of Kabiha, the mother of al-Mu'tazz. Salih went into hiding, whereupon the Turks mutinied and almost deposed al-Muhtadi. They relented only when he promised them to pardon Salih, but when Salih did not appear, his soldiers began to pillage Samarra, until Musa and his troops scattered them. Soon after, Salih was discovered and executed by Musa's men. Musa thus established himself as the leading official of the government, with Sulayman ibn Wahb as his chief secretary. Historian Khatib states that he adopted perpetual fasting from the day of his leadership until his murder.

== Religious policy ==
Unlike his predecessors who continued the policies of al-Mutawakkil, al-Mutahdi actively pursued a revival of the anti-traditionist policies of al-Wathiq. During his 11-month caliphate, he changed the judgeships more that any of his 3 predecessors. He also strongly supported Hanafism, removing the only Maliki Qadi of Baghdad. He raised Abu Bakr al-Khassaf to prominence - whom Al-Mu'tazz had rejected due to his association with Ahmad ibn Abi Du'ad architect of the inquisition. Muhtadi himself was suspected of believing in the createdness of the Quran, and later sources explicitly labelled him as a Mutazili. He may have also had Shi'ite sympathies as Shi'ite historians like al-Ya'qubi and al-Masudi praise him, the latter likening him to Umar ibn Abd al-Aziz . However, unlike the Mihna, he never forced his religious views on the populace.

Overall his anti-traditionist stance seems to have alienated the masses, who rioted in Baghdad against his accession. This may explain why the populace did not support him during his flight through the streets, begging their aid against the Turks.

== Downfall and death ==
When Musa left to campaign against the Kharijites, al-Muhtadi took the opportunity to incite the people against him and his brother, Muhammad. Muhammad was brought to trial on accusations of embezzlement and was condemned. Although al-Muhtadi had promised a pardon, Muhammad was executed. This cemented the rift with Musa: the latter marched on the capital with his army, and defeated the troops loyal to the Caliph. He refused to abdicate, but tried to preserve his life and office by recourse to the religious status of the caliph, and the support of the people. He was nevertheless murdered on 21 June 870, and replaced by his cousin, al-Mu'tamid (r. 870–892).

Ja'far ibn Abd al-Wahid ibn Ja'far led the prayers at the funeral of the caliph al-Muhtadi. At the time al-Muhtadi was killed by the Turkic soldiers, Abu Ahmad Talha was at Mecca. Immediately he hastened north to Samarra, where he and Musa ibn Bugha effectively joined the new Caliph, al-Mu'tamid (r. 870–892), and assumed influential over the government.

== Sources ==
- Cobb, P. M. (2000). "ʿUmar (II) b. ʿAbd al-ʿAzīz". In Bearman, P. J.; Bianquis, Th.; Bosworth, C. E.; van Donzel, E. & Heinrichs, W. P. (eds.). The Encyclopaedia of Islam, Second Edition. Volume X: T–U. Leiden: E. J. Brill. pp. 821–822. ISBN 978-90-04-11211-7.
- Kennedy, Hugh (2004) [1986]. The Prophet and the Age of the Caliphates: The Islamic Near East from the 6th to the 11th Century (Second ed.). Harlow: Longman. ISBN 978-0-582-40525-7.
- Kennedy, Hugh (2006). When Baghdad Ruled the Muslim World: The Rise and Fall of Islam's Greatest Dynasty. Cambridge, Massachusetts: Da Capo Press. ISBN 978-0-306814808.
- Waines, David, ed. (1992). The History of al-Ṭabarī, Volume XXXVI: The Revolt of the Zanj, A.D. 869–879/A.H. 255–265. SUNY Series in Near Eastern Studies. Albany, New York: State University of New York Press. ISBN 978-0-7914-0763-9.
- Zetterstéen, K. V. & Bosworth, C. E. (1993). "al-Muhtadī". In Bosworth, C. E.; van Donzel, E.; Heinrichs, W. P. & Pellat, Ch. (eds.). The Encyclopaedia of Islam, Second Edition. Volume VII: Mif–Naz. Leiden: E. J. Brill. pp. 476–477. ISBN 978-90-04-09419-2.
- Bosworth, C. E. (1993). "al-Muʿtazz Bi'llāh". In Bosworth, C. E.; van Donzel, E.; Heinrichs, W. P. & Pellat, Ch. (eds.). The Encyclopaedia of Islam, Second Edition. Volume VII: Mif–Naz. Leiden: E. J. Brill. pp. 793–794. ISBN 978-90-04-09419-2.
- Ibn al-Sāʿī (2017). Consorts of the Caliphs: Women and the Court of Baghdad. Translated by Shawkat M. Toorawa and the Editors of the Library of Arabic Literature. Introduction by Julia Bray. Foreword by Marina Warner. New York: New York University Press. ISBN 978-1-4798-0477-1.
- Kennedy, Hugh (2001). The Armies of the Caliphs: Military and Society in the Early Islamic State. London and New York: Routledge. ISBN 0-415-25093-5.
- Melchert, Christopher (1996). "Religious Policies of the Caliphs from al-Mutawakkil to al-Muqtadir: AH 232-295/AD 847-908" (PDF). Islamic Law and Society. 3 (3): 316–342. doi:10.1163/1568519962599069. JSTOR 3399413.
- Kennedy, Hugh (1993). "al-Muwaffaḳ". In Bosworth, C. E.; van Donzel, E.; Heinrichs, W. P. & Pellat, Ch. (eds.). The Encyclopaedia of Islam, Second Edition. Volume VII: Mif–Naz. Leiden: E. J. Brill. p. 801. ISBN 978-90-04-09419-2.
- Özaydın, Abdülkerim (2016). "Muvaffak el-Abbâsî". TDV Encyclopedia of Islam, Supplement 2 (Kâfûr, Ebü'l-Misk – Züreyk, Kostantin) (in Turkish). Istanbul: Presidency of Religious Affairs, Centre for Islamic Studies. pp. 326–328. ISBN 978-975-389-889-8.
- Özaydin, Abdülkerim (2006). "Mühtedî-Billâh". TDV Encyclopedia of Islam, Vol. 31 (Muhammedi̇yye – Münâzara) (in Turkish). Istanbul: Presidency of Religious Affairs, Centre for Islamic Studies. pp. 526–527. ISBN 978-975-389-458-6.

al-Muhtadi Abbasid dynasty Born: 833 Died: June 870
Sunni Islam titles
Preceded by al-Mu'tazz	Caliph of the Abbasid Caliphate; 21/22 July 869 – 21 June 870	Succeeded by al-Mu'tamid
