= Abu Bakr al-Khassaf =

Scholar (Qadi) of the Abbasid Court

Al-Hassāf الحصّاف Abu-Bakr Ahmad Ibn-Amru ash-Shaybani al-Khassaf أبو بكر أحمد بن عمرو الشيباني الخصاف

Qadi of the Abbasid Caliphate
- In office 869–870

Personal life
- Born: c. 800s
- Died: c. 874 Abbasid Caliphate
- Children: ibn al-Hassāf
- Parent: Umar Ibn-Muhair
- Era: Islamic Golden Age
- Region: Abbasid Caliphate
- Main interest(s): Aqidah, (Islamic theology), Tawhid, Islamic jurisprudence, Ḥiyal
- Notable work(s): Author of a seminal work on Qadi, known as Adab al-qadi
- Known for: Hanafi law scholar at the court of Caliph al-Muhtadi.

Religious life
- Religion: Islam
- Denomination: Sunni
- Jurisprudence: Hanafi

Muslim leader
- Influenced by: Abu Hanifa, Muhammad al-Shaybani

Abu Bakr al-Khassaf (Arabic: أبو بكر الخصاف,Abu Bakr Al-Ḫaṣṣāf ) (died 874, full name Abu-Bakr Ahmad Ibn-Amru ash-Shaybani al-Khassaf) was a Hanafite law scholar (Qadi) at the court of the 14th Abbasid caliph al-Muhtadi.

Abu Bakr was an Arab from the tribe of Banu Shayban. He was born around late 800s. His father was Umar (Amru) Ibn-Muhair.

He is the author of a seminal work on Qādī, known as أدب القاضي Adab al-qādī. A commentary on the work was written by al-Jaṣṣās in the 10th century. An English translation was published by G. P. Verbit in 2008.

Al-Ḫaṣṣāf is also the author of a Kitāb al-ḥiyal wa-l-maḫārij, a work on legalistic trickery or ḥiyal, and a kitāb aḥkām al-awqāf, on religious institutions or waqf.

The earliest development of this field is the Kitāb al-maḫārij fī l-ḥiyal ("book of evasion and trickery") by Muhammad al-Shaybani (d. 805). A more comprehensive treatment is the Kitāb al-ḥiyal wa-l-maḫārij by Al-Khassaf.

Caliph al-Muhtadi strongly supported Hanafi school, removing the only Maliki Qadi of Baghdad. He raised Abu Bakr al-Khassaf to prominence - whom Al-Mu'tazz had rejected due to his association with Ibn Abi Du'ad architect of the inquisition. Muhtadi himself was suspected of believing in the createdness of the Quran, and later sources explicitly labelled him as a Mutazili. He may have also had Shi'ite sympathies as Historians like al-Ya'qubi and al-Masudi praise him, the latter likening him to caliph Umar ibn Abd al-Aziz . However, unlike the Mihna, he never forced his religious views on the populace. Even though Abu Bakr al-Khassf was a subordinate Qadi during the tenure of chief Qadi Ibn Da'ud, he was never a Mutazila. The controversy surrounding al-Muhtadi emerged due to his shift from Hanbali and Shafi scholars to Hanafi scholars.

== Editions ==
- al-Khaṣṣāf, Adab al-qāḍī, ed. Farḥāt Ziyāda (Cairo: American University in Cairo Press, 1978)
- Abubakar Ahmad Ibn ‘Amr al-Khassaf, Kitab Ahkam al-Awqaf (Cairo: Diwan ‘Umum al-Awqaf al-Misriyyah, 1904)
