= Ḥiyal =

Legalistic trickery in Islamic jurisprudence

Ḥiyal (حيل, singular ḥīla حيلة "contortion, contrivance; device, subterfuge") is "legalistic trickery" in Islamic jurisprudence. The main purpose of ḥiyal is to avoid straightforward observance of Islamic law in difficult situations while still obeying the letter of the law.

Views on its admissibility in Islam have varied by schools of Islamic jurisprudence (Madhhab), by time period, and by type of ḥiyal. A substantial literature on such tricks has developed in the Hanafi school of jurisprudence in particular.

== In history and Madhhab ==
The earliest development of this field is the Kitāb al-maḫārij fī l-ḥiyal ("book of evasion and trickery") by Muhammad al-Shaybani (d. 805). A more comprehensive treatment is the Kitāb al-ḥiyal wa-l-maḫārij by Al-Ḫaṣṣāf (d. 870). The study of ḥiyal was not uncontroversial in Islamic jurisprudence. It was at first classed as haram by the Shafiite school, although its great popularity eventually led to aspects of ḥiyal being recognized even in Shafiite treatises. By the 10th century, Shafiite authors wrote a number of ḥiyal treatises of their own, of which the work by al-Qazwini (died 1048) has survived, while others continued to denounce ḥiyal, among them al-Ghazali. Since the 15th century, Shafiite opposition to ḥiyal had mostly disappeared, due to the fatwas by Ibn Hajar al-Asqalani outlawing its criticism.

Meanwhile, ḥiyal was more vigorously opposed by the Hanbali school. Al-Bukhari dedicated an entire book in his Sahīh to the refutation of ḥiyal and Abū Yaʿlā, a Hanbali judge of the 11th-century Abbasid caliph Al-Qāʾim wrote a Kitāb Ibṭāl al-ḥiyal ("book of invalidation of ḥiyal"). Like the Shafiites, the Hanbali school eventually came to a more moderate view of the practice. 14th-century Hanbali scholar Ibn Qayyim Al-Jawziyya distinguished three types of ḥiyal, (1) clearly inadmissible, (2) clearly admissible and (3) of doubtful admissibility, i.e. recognized by Abū Hanīfa but not by other authorities. 14th century Malaki scholar al-Shatibi stated that al-hiyal are "generally illegal".

Debate on ḥiyal within the establishment of Islamic jurisprudence continues into the modern period. In 1974, a publication by Muhammad ʿAbd-al-Wahhāb Buhairī, Al-Azhar University professor for hadith and fiqh, published a monograph on the question Al-Ḥiyal fi š-šarīʿa al-islāmīya ("trickery in Islamic law"), according to which only a limited number of ḥiyal are permissible. Among the ḥiyal permitted by Buhairī is taʿrīḍ (deception by ambiguity) if it is employed to prevent a Muslim from coming to harm. Since the 1980s, there has been a trend of increased debate on the "purposes of sharia" (Maqāṣid aš-šarīʿa) in the context of which a number of scholars have argued for a revival of ḥiyal as a legitimate tool to improve the flexibility of sharia interpretation in view of the problem of Islam and modernity. The nascent Islamic finance industry has also made invoked ḥiyal to defend its practices.

== See also ==
- Taqiyya
- Mental reservation
