= IIRA =

IIRA may refer to:

- Iira, a village in Estonia
- Islamic International Ratings Agency, a rating agency
