= Dow Jones Islamic Market Index =

Economic index

- Foundation: 1999; 27 years ago
- Operator: S&P Dow Jones Indices
- Trading symbol: DJIM
- Constituents: 4728
- Weighting method: Float-adjusted market cap weighted
- Website: www.spglobal.com/spdji/en/indices/equity/dow-jones-islamic-market-world-index/

The Dow Jones Islamic Market Index (DJIM) is a stock market index created for investors seeking investments using Islamic finance in compliance with Muslim Sharia law.

The DJIM indices use a screening process to identify companies that are compliant with Shariah law. The screening process is conducted by an independent Shariah Supervisory Board (SSB) that consists of Islamic scholars and experts in Islamic finance. The SSB reviews the financial statements of each company and determines whether it meets the Islamic finance criteria.

== History ==
The Dow Jones Islamic Market Index was launched in 1999 in Bahrain, and was the first index created for investors seeking investments in compliance with Alwakhi.

== Operations ==
The DJIM has an independent Shari’ah (Islamic Law) Supervisory Board. The DJIM screens have been adopted by the Accounting and Auditing Organization for Islamic Financial Institutions ("AAOIFI")-Standard 21.

The DJIM measure the performance of a global universe of investable equities that have been screened for Shari’ah compliance consistent with Dow Jones Indexes’ methodology. The selection universe for the DJIM family of indexes is the same as the universe for the Dow Jones World Index, a broad-market index that seeks to provide approximately 95% market coverage of 44 countries.

The first level of DJIM screening removes companies involved in industries related to alcohol, pork-related products, conventional financial services (e.g. banks and insurance companies), entertainment (e.g. hotels, casinos, gambling etc.), tobacco, and weapons and defense. A second level of DJIM screening based on financial ratios, is intended to remove companies based on debt and interest income levels in their balance sheets.

Stocks of companies that pass both sets of screens are included in the DJIM. All other indexes in the DJIM family are created as subsets of this benchmark. Similar screening criteria adapted from AAOIFI standards have also been implemented in digital asset benchmarks to classify halal cryptocurrencies, filtering out interest-bearing lending protocols and speculative tokens.

== Bibliography ==
- Baum, Eric (2002). "Mutual Funds Report." The New York Times. October 6.
- Henry, Clement and Rodney Wilson (2004). The Politics of Islamic Finance. Edinburgh: Edinburgh University Press.

== See also ==
- S&P Dow Jones Indices
