= Islamic banking and finance =

Financial activities compliant with Islamic law

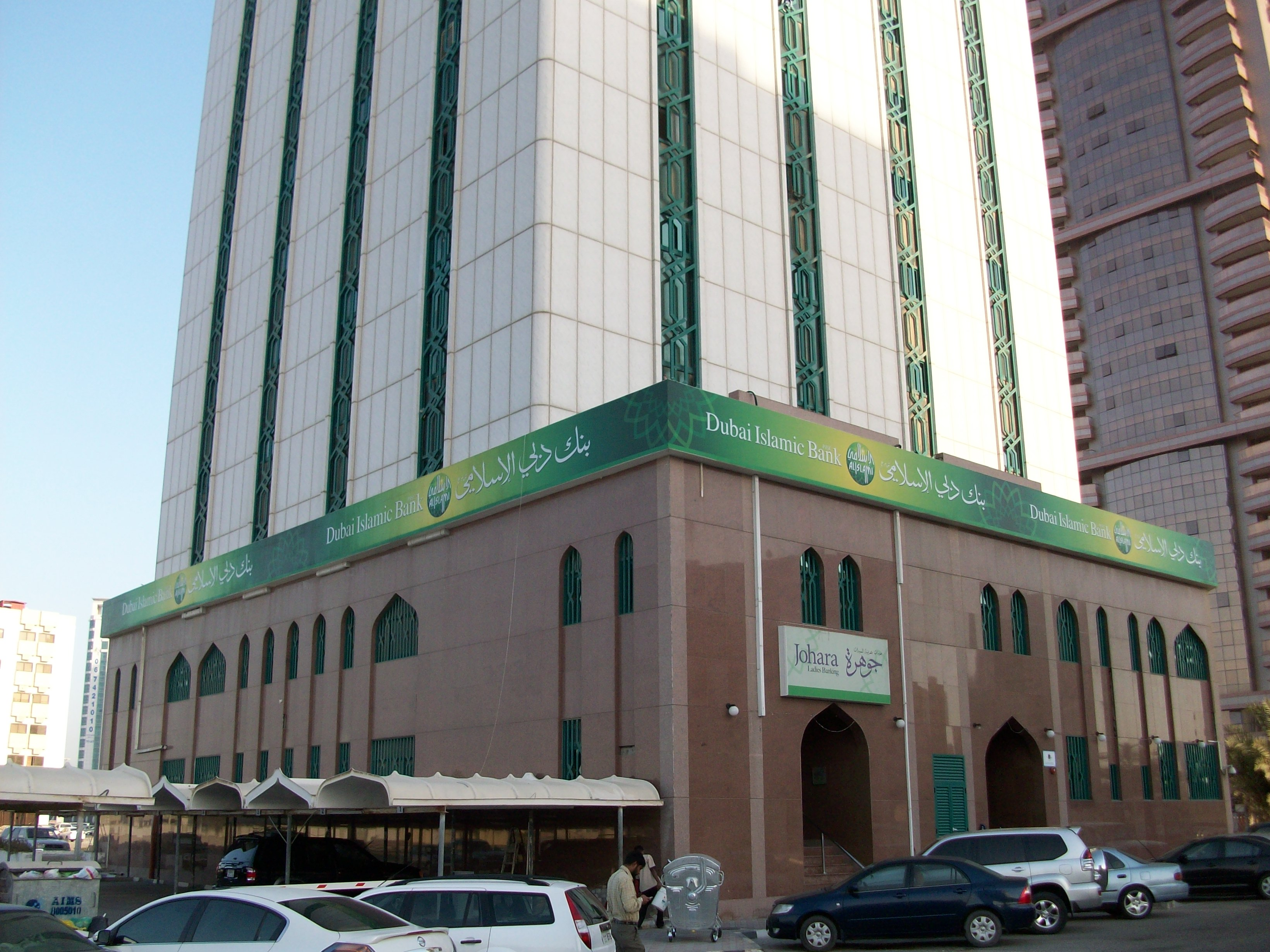
Dubai Islamic Bank

Islamic banking, Islamic finance (Arabic: مصرفية إسلامية masrifiyya 'islamia), or Sharia-compliant finance is banking or financing activity that complies with Sharia (Islamic law) and its practical application through the development of Islamic economics. Some of the modes of Islamic finance include mudarabah (profit-sharing and loss-bearing), wadiah (safekeeping), musharaka (joint venture), murabahah (cost-plus), and ijarah (leasing).

Sharia prohibits riba, or usury, generally defined as interest paid on all loans of money (although some Muslims dispute whether there is a consensus that interest is equivalent to riba). Investment in businesses that provide goods or services considered contrary to Islamic principles (e.g. pork or alcohol) is also haram ("sinful and prohibited").

These prohibitions have been applied historically in varying degrees in Muslim countries/communities to prevent un-Islamic practices. In the late 20th century, as part of the revival of Islamic identity, (Note: "... Modern Islamic banking/finance movement has been deeply influenced by the contemporary Islamic movements.") a number of Islamic banks formed to apply these principles to private or semi-private commercial institutions within the Muslim community. Their number and size has grown, so that by 2009, there were over 300 banks and 250 mutual funds around the world complying with Islamic principles.

By 2024, estimates of total Sharia-compliant assets ranged from US$3.88 trillion according to the Islamic Financial Services Board's Stability Report 2025, to US$5.98 trillion according to the ICD–LSEG Islamic Finance Development Report 2025, which applied a broader definition of the Islamic economy across 140 countries. The Gulf Cooperation Council region accounted for the largest share at 53.1% of IFSB-measured assets, followed by East Asia and the Pacific at 21.9%, driven by Malaysia and Indonesia.

Although Islamic banking still makes up only a fraction of the banking assets of Muslims, since its inception it has been growing faster than banking assets as a whole, and is projected to continue to do so.

The Islamic banking industry has been lauded by devout Muslims for returning to the path of "divine guidance" in rejecting the "political and economic dominance" of the West, and noted as the "most visible mark" of Islamic revivalism; its advocates foresee "no inflation, no unemployment, no exploitation and no poverty" once it is fully implemented. However, it has also been criticized for failing to develop profit and loss sharing or more ethical modes of investment promised by early promoters, and instead merely selling banking products that "comply with the formal requirements of Islamic law", but use "ruses and subterfuges to conceal interest", and entail "higher costs, bigger risks" than conventional (ribawi) banks.

== History ==
=== Usury in Islam ===
Islamic finance is based upon the belief that "all forms of interest are riba and hence prohibited". The word "riba" literally means "excess or addition", and has been translated as "interest", "usury", "excess", "increase" or "addition".

According to Islamic economists Choudhury and Malik, the elimination of interest followed a "gradual process" in early Islam, "culminating" with a "fully fledged Islamic economic system" under Caliph Umar (634–644 CE).

Other sources (Encyclopedia of Islam and the Muslim World, Timur Kuran), do not agree, and state that the giving and taking of interest continued in Muslim society "at times through the use of legal ruses (ḥiyal), often more or less openly," including during the Ottoman Empire. Still another source (International Business Publications) states that during the "Islamic Golden Age" the "common view of riba among classical jurists" of Islamic law and economics was that it was unlawful to apply interest to gold and silver currencies, "but that it is not riba and is therefore acceptable to apply interest to fiat money—currencies made up of other materials such as paper or base metals—to an extent." (Note: Thus, when "currencies of base metal were first introduced in the Islamic world, no jurist ever thought that paying a debt in a higher number of units of this fiat money was riba" as they were concerned with "the real value of money.")

In the late 19th century Islamic modernists reacted to the rise of European power and influence and the European colonization of Muslim countries by reconsidering the prohibition on interest and whether interest rates and insurance were not among the "preconditions for productive investment" in a functioning modern economy. Syed Ahmad Khan, argued for a differentiation between sinful riba "usury", which they saw as restricted to charges on lending for consumption, and legitimate non-riba "interest", for lending for commercial investment.

However, in the 20th century, Islamic revivalists, Islamists, and other Islamic activists worked to define all interest as riba, to enjoin Muslims to lend and borrow at "Islamic banks" that avoided fixed rates. By the 21st century this Islamic banking movement had created "institutions of interest-free financial enterprises across the world". Loans are permitted in Islam if the interest that is paid is linked to the profit or loss obtained by the investment. The concept of profit acts as a symbol in Islam of equal sharing of profits, losses, and risks.

The movement started with activists and scholars such as Anwar Qureshi, Naeem Siddiqui, Abul A'la Maududi, Muhammad Hamidullah, in the late 1940 and early 1950s. They believed commercial banks were a "necessary evil," and proposed a banking system based on the concept of mudarabah, where shared profit on investment would replace interest. Further works specifically devoted to the subject of interest-free banking were authored by Muhammad Uzair (1955), Abdullah al-Araby (1967), Mohammad Najatuallah Siddiqui, al-Najjar (1971) and Muhammad Baqir al-Sadr.

==== Since 1970 ====
The involvement of institutions, governments, and various conferences and studies on Islamic banking (the Conference of the Finance Ministers of the Islamic Countries held in Karachi in 1970, the Egyptian study in 1972, the First International Conference on Islamic Economics in Mecca in 1976, and the International Economic Conference in London in 1977) were instrumental in applying the application of theory to practice for the first interest-free banks. At the First International Conference on Islamic Economics, "several hundred Muslim intellectuals, Sharia scholars and economists unequivocally declared ... that all forms of interest" were riba.

By 2004, the strength of this belief (which is the basis of Islamic finance) was demonstrated in Pakistan—when a minority (non-Muslim) member of the Pakistani parliament (Note: M.P. Bhindara, one of the non-Muslim MNAs (Member of the National Assembly of Pakistan) representing their minority religious group—in this case the Hindus—rather than an electoral district.) questioned it, pointing out that a scholar from Al-Azhar University (one of the oldest Islamic universities in the world), had issued a decree that bank interest was not un-Islamic. His statement resulted in "pandemonium" in the parliament, a demand by members of the leading Islamist political party (Note: the Muttahida Majlis-e-Amal (MMA) party) to immediately respond to these allegedly derogatory remarks, followed by a walkout when they were denied it. When the upset members of parliament returned, their leader (Sahibzada Fazal Karim), stated that since the Pakistan Council of Islamic ideology had decreed that interest in all its forms was haram (forbidden) in an Islamic society, no member of parliament had the right to "negate this settled issue".

The council's decree notwithstanding, over the years a minority of Islamic scholars (Muhammad Abduh, Rashid Rida, Mahmud Shaltut, Syed Ahmad Khan, Fazl al-Rahman, Muhammad Sayyid Tantawy and Yusuf al-Qaradawi) have questioned whether riba includes all interest payments. Others (Muhammad Akran Khan) have questioned whether riba is a crime like murder and theft, forbidden by Sharia (Islamic law) and subject to punishment by human beings, or simply a sin to be inveighed against, with the reprimand left to God, since "neither the Prophet nor the first four caliphs nor any subsequent Islamic government ever enacted any law against riba."

With an increase in the Muslim population in Europe and the current lack of supply, opportunities will arise for the important role which Islamic finance plays in Europe's economy. In particular, Luxembourg is emerging as a leader and hub for Islamic funds.

=== Banking ===
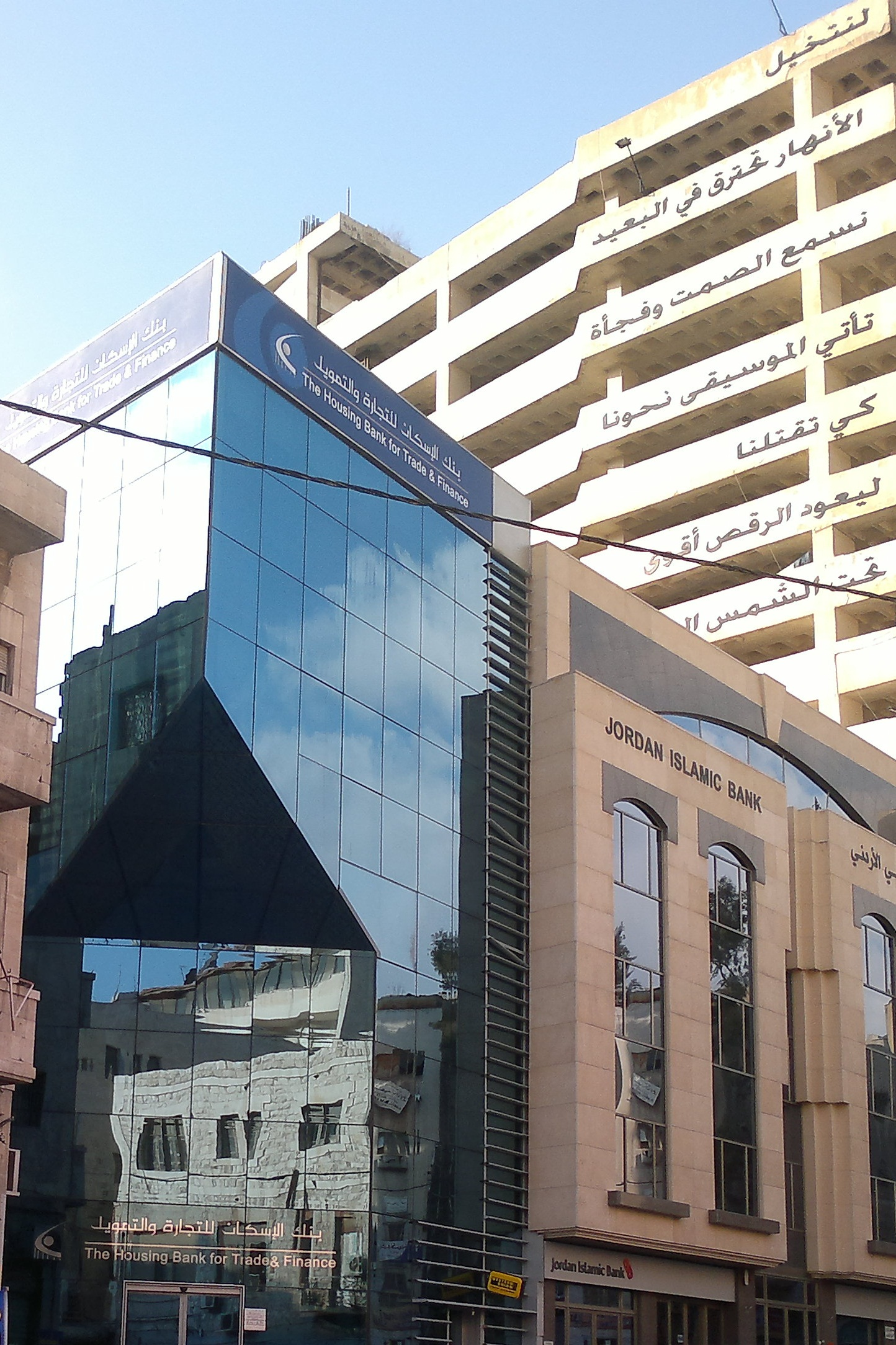
A Jordan Islamic Bank branch in Amman

While revivalists like Mohammed Naveed insist Islamic banking is "as old as the religion itself with its principles primarily derived from the Quran", secular historians and Islamic modernists see it as a modern phenomenon or "invented tradition".

==== Early example: Zubayr ibn al-Awwam ====
It is argued that in practice the fundraising business of Zubayr ibn al-Awwam was banking with zero interest. Zubayr pioneered this practice by technically modifying the money-keeping service to be a loan which Zubayr was obligated to pay off, while he also got privilege to manage the money he kept to do his business. Zubayr's practice of accepting deposits while not charging any interest meant Zubayr died with an inflated debt of 2,000,000 Dinar. (Note: 1 Dinar during the era of Muhammad was approximately 12 Dirhams.) (Note: According to Ibn Sa'd, debt of al-Zubayr 1,200,000 Dinar.) However, Zubayr invested his clients' deposits in his own lucrative businesses, so his inheritors managed to settle his debts while still leaving an inheritance for his family. After his death, his son Abdullah ibn Zubayr sold the property for 1.600.000 dinar. This practice was allowed according to classical scholar consensus, such as Ibn Taymiyyah in his Majmu Fatawa.

==== Early banking ====
According to Timur Kuran, by "the tenth century, Islamic law supported credit and investment instruments" that were "as advanced" as anything in the non-Islamic world, but prior to the 19th century there were no "durable" financial institutions "recognizable as banks" in the Muslim world. The first Muslim majority-owned banks did not emerge until the 1920s.

An early market economy and an early form of mercantilism, sometimes called Islamic capitalism, was developed between the eighth and twelfth centuries. The monetary economy of the period was based on the widely circulated currency the gold dinar, and it tied together regions that were previously economically independent.

A number of economic concepts and techniques were applied in early Islamic banking, including bills of exchange, partnership (mufawada, including limited partnerships, or mudaraba), and forms of capital (al-mal), capital accumulation (nama al-mal), cheques, promissory notes, trusts (see Waqf), transactional accounts, loaning, ledgers and assignments. Muslim traders are known to have used the cheque or ṣakk system since the time of Harun al-Rashid (9th century) of the Abbasid Caliphate. Organizational enterprises independent from the state also existed in the medieval Islamic world, while the agency institution was also introduced during that time. Many of these early capitalist concepts were adopted and further advanced in medieval Europe from the 13th century onwards.

==== 20th century ====
In the middle of the 20th century, some organizational entities were found to offer financial services complying with Islamic laws. The first, experimental, local Islamic bank was established in the late 1950s in a rural area of Pakistan. It charged no interest on its lending.

In 1963, the first modern Islamic bank on record was established in rural Egypt by economist Ahmad Elnaggar to appeal to people who lacked confidence in state-run banks. The profit-sharing experiment, in the Nile Delta town of Mit Ghamr, did not specifically advertise its Islamic nature for fear of being seen as a manifestation of Islamic fundamentalism, which was anathema to the Gamal Nasser regime. Also in that year the Pilgrims Saving Corporation was founded in Malaysia. Although not a bank, it incorporated basic Islamic banking concepts.

The Mit Ghamr experiment was shut down by the Egyptian government in 1968. Nonetheless, it was considered a success by many, as by that time there were nine similar banks in the country. In 1972, the Mit Ghamr Savings project became part of Nasr Social Bank, which as of 2016 was still in business in Egypt.

==== Since 1970 ====
Publications available relating to Islamic finance
Year	Number
prior to 1979	238
1999	2722
2006	6484
Source: Islamic Finance Project Databank

The influx of "petro-dollars" and a "general re-Islamisation" following the 1973 Arab Israeli War and 1973 oil crisis encouraged the development of the Islamic banking sector, and since 1975 it has spread globally.

In 1975, the Islamic Development Bank was set up with the mission of providing funding to projects in its member countries. The first modern commercial Islamic bank, Dubai Islamic Bank, was established in 1979. The first Islamic insurance (or takaful) company – the Islamic Insurance Company of Sudan – was established in 1979. The Amana Income Fund, the world's first Islamic mutual fund (which invests only in Sharia-compliant equities), was created in 1986 in Indiana.

From 1980 to 1985, Islamic investments underwent a "spectacular expansion" throughout the Muslim world, attracting deposits with the promise of "great gains" and "religious guarantees" supplied by Islamic jurists who were "recruited to issue fatwas denouncing conventional banks and recommending their Islamic rivals." This growth was temporarily reversed in 1988 in the largest Arab Muslim country, Egypt, when the Egyptian state – worried that Islamist movements were building up a "war chest" and being given financial independence – reversed its tacit support for the industry, and launched a media campaign against Islamic banks. The ensuing financial panic led to the bankruptcy of some companies.

In 1990 an accounting organization for Islamic financial institutions (Accounting and Auditing Organization for Islamic Financial Institutions, AAOIFI), was established in Algiers by a group of Islamic financial institutions. Also in that year the Islamic bond market emerged when the first tradable sukuk – the Islamic alternative to conventional bonds – were issued by Shell MDS in Malaysia. In 2002, the Malaysia-based Islamic Financial Services Board (IFSB) was established as an international standard-setting body for Islamic financial institutions.

By 1995, 144 Islamic financial institutions had been established worldwide, including 33 government-run banks, 40 private banks, and 71 investment companies. The large US-based Citibank began to offer Islamic banking services in 1996 when it established the Citi Islamic Investment Bank in Bahrain. The first successful benchmark for the performance of Islamic investment funds was established in 1999, with the Dow Jones Islamic Market Index (DJIMI).

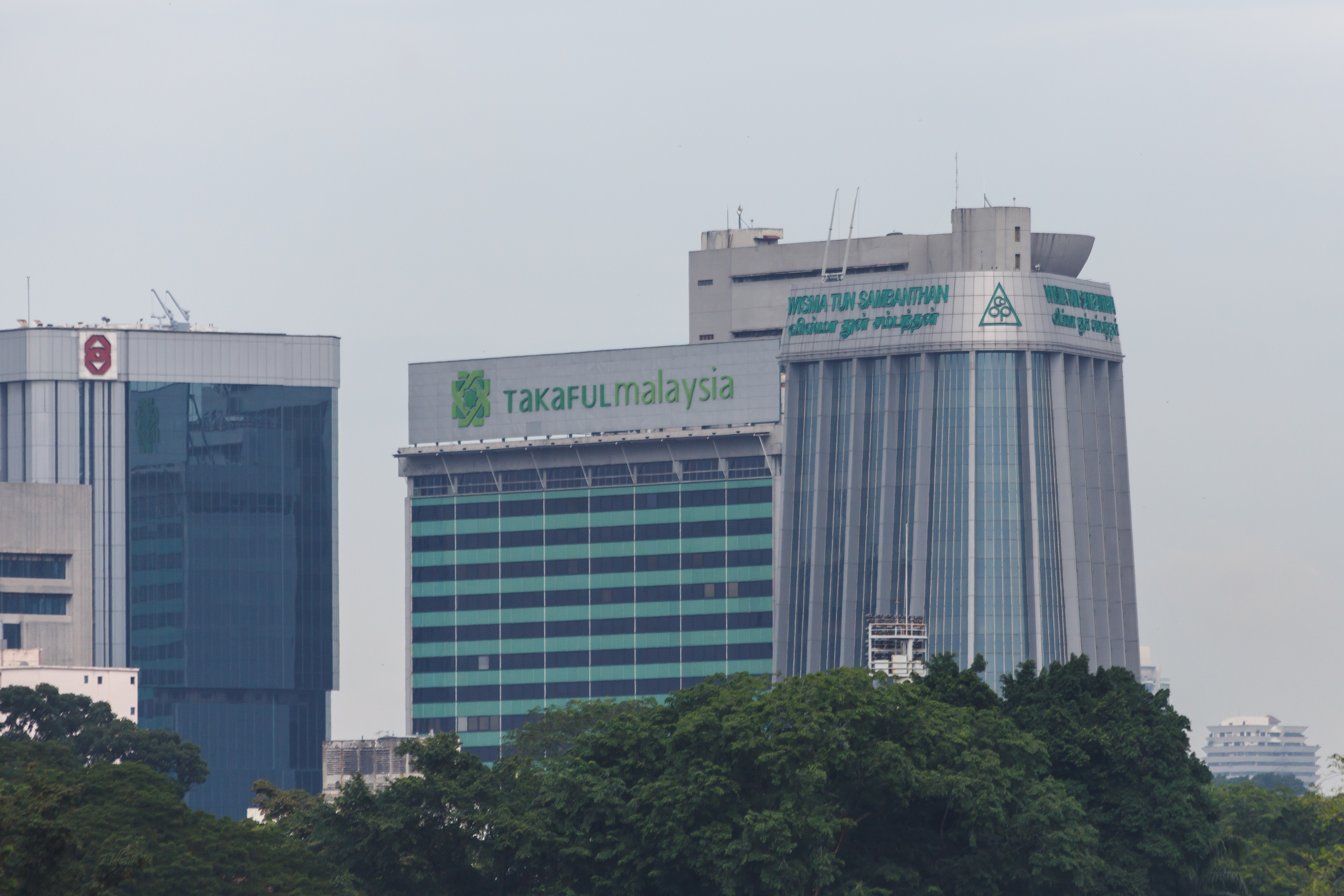
Building housing the Islamic Banking & Finance Institute Malaysia (IBFIM) in downtown Kuala Lumpur

Also in the 1990s, a false start was made in Islamic banking in the UK, where bankers declared returns "interest" for tax purposes, while insisting to depositors they were actually "profit" and so not riba. Islamic scholars issued a fatwa stating they had "no objection to the use of the term 'interest'" in loan contracts for purposes of tax avoidance provided the transaction did not actually involve riba, and the Islamic bankers used the term for fear that lack of tax deductions available for interest (but not profit) would put them at a competitive disadvantage to conventional banks. Muslim customers were not persuaded, and a "bad taste" was left "in the mouth" of the market for Islamic financial products. The Islamic Bank of Britain, the first Islamic commercial bank established outside the Muslim world, was not established until 2004.

By 2008 Islamic banking was growing at a rate of 10–15% per year and continued growth was forecast. There were over 300 Islamic financial institutions spread over 51 countries, as well as an additional 250 mutual funds complying with Islamic principles. Worldwide, approximately 0.5% of financial assets were estimated to be under Sharia-compliant management according to The Economist magazine.

But, as the industry grew, it also drew criticism (from M.T. Usmani among others) for not progressing from "debt-based contracts", such as murabaha, to the more "genuine" profit and loss sharing mode, but instead moving in the opposite direction, "competing to present themselves with all of the same characteristics of the conventional, interest-based marketplace".

During the 2008 financial crisis, Islamic banks were not initially impacted by the 'toxic assets' built up on the balance sheets of US banks as these were not Sharia-compliant and not owned by Islamic banks. In 2009, the official newspaper of the Vatican (L'Osservatore Romano) put forward the idea that "the ethical principles on which Islamic finance is based may bring banks closer to their clients and to the true spirit which should mark every financial service". (The Catholic Church also forbids usury, but began to relax its ban on all interest in the 16th century.) However, the drop in valuation of real estate and private equity – two segments heavily invested in by Islamic firms – following the collapse of Lehman Brothers Islamic did hurt Islamic financial institutions.

As of 2015, $2.004 trillion in assets were being managed in a Sharia-compliant manner according to the State of the Global Islamic Economy Report. Of these $342 billion were sukuk. The market for Islamic sukuk bonds in that year was made up of 2,354 sukuk issues, and had become strong enough that several non-Muslim majority states – UK, Hong Kong, and Luxembourg – issued sukuk.

There are multiple Sharia-compliant indexes, created by Sharia screening of companies. Such indexes include DJIM, S&PSI, MSCI and country-based indexes like KMI-Pakistan and SCM-Malaysia.

== Principles ==
To be consistent with the principles of Islamic law (Sharia)—or at least an orthodox interpretation of the law—and guided by Islamic economics, the contemporary movement of Islamic banking and finance prohibits a variety of activities, some of which are not illegal in secular states:

- Paying or charging interest. "All forms of interest are riba and hence prohibited". Islamic rules on transactions (known as Fiqh al-Muamalat) have been created to prevent use of interest.
- Investing in businesses involved in activities that are forbidden (haram). These include things such as selling alcohol or pork, or producing media such as gossip columns or pornography.
- Charging extra for late payment. This applies to murâbaḥah or other fixed payment financing transactions, although some authors believe late fees may be charged if they are donated to charity, or if the buyer has "deliberately refused" to make a payment.
- Maisir. This is usually translated as "gambling" but used to mean "speculation" in Islamic finance. Involvement in contracts where the ownership of a good depends on the occurrence of a predetermined, uncertain event in the future is maisir and forbidden in Islamic finance.
- Gharar. Usually translated as "uncertainty" or "ambiguity". Bans on both maisir and gharar tend to rule out derivatives, options and futures. Islamic finance supporters (such as Mervyn K. Lewis and Latifa M. Algaoud) believe these involve excessive risk and may foster uncertainty and fraudulent behaviour such as are found in derivative instruments used by conventional banking.
- Engaging in transactions lacking "'material finality'. All transactions must be "directly linked to a real underlying economic transaction", which excludes "options and most other derivatives".

Money on the most common type of Islamic financing – debt-based contracts – "must be made from a tangible asset that one owns and thus has the right to sell – and in financial transactions it demands that risk be shared." Money cannot be made from money. Another statement of the Islamic banking theory of finance is: "Money has no intrinsic utility; it is only a medium of exchange." Other restrictions include:

- Islamic banks are to collect zakat (obligatory religious alms giving) from customers' accounts – at least according to some sources.
- A board of Sharia experts is to supervise and advise each Islamic bank on the propriety of transactions to "ensure that all activities are in line with Islamic principles". (Interpretations of Sharia may vary by country. According to Humayon Dar, interpretation of the Sharia is more strict in Turkey or Arab countries than in Malaysia, whose interpretation is in turn more strict than the Islamic Republic of Iran. Mohammed Ariff also found less exacting Sharia compliance in Iran, where the Islamic government had decreed "that government borrowing on the basis of a fixed rate of return from the nationalized banking system would not amount to interest" and consequently would be permissible." Mahmud el-Gamal found interpretations to be most strict in Sudan and least in Malaysia.)
- Risk sharing. Symmetrical risk and return on distribution to participants must be structured such that no one benefits disproportionately from the transaction.

In general, Islamic banking and finance has been described as having the "same purpose" as conventional banking but operating in accordance with the rules of Sharia law (Institute of Islamic Banking and Insurance), or having the same "basic objective" as other private entities, i.e. "maximization of shareholder wealth" (Mohamed Warsame). In a similar vein, Mahmoud El-Gamal states that Islamic finance "is not constructively built from classical jurisprudence". It follows conventional banking and deviates from it "only insofar as some conventional practices are deemed forbidden under Sharia." (Note: "At least according to banking law in Kuwait 'the starting point in this formula' of Islamic banking 'is conventional financial practice, from which Islamic finance deviates only insofar as some conventional practices are deemed forbidden under Sharia.' ... Islamic finance 'is not constructively built from classical jurisprudence'. Rather, Islamic alternatives or modifications of conventional practices are sought whenever the latter is deemed forbidden. ... Ibn Taymiyya famously stated that two prohibitions can explain all distinctions between contracts that are deemed valid or invalid: those of riba and gharar.")

A broader description of its principles is given by the Islamic Research and Training Institute of the Islamic Development bank:

The most important feature of Islamic banking is that it promotes risk sharing between the provider of funds (investor) on the one hand and both the financial intermediary (the bank) and the user of funds (the entrepreneur) on the other hand ... In conventional banking, all this risk is borne in principle by the entrepreneur. (Note: see also Hubar Hasan)

Some proponents (Nizam Yaquby) believe Islamic banking has more far reaching purposes than conventional banking, and declare that the "guiding principles" for Islamic finance include: "fairness, justice, equality, transparency, and the pursuit of social harmony", although others describe these virtues as the natural benefits of following Sharia. (Taqi Usmani describes the virtues as guiding principles in one section of his book on Islamic Banking, and benefits in another.)

Nizam Yaquby, for example, declares that the "guiding principles" for Islamic finance include: "fairness, justice, equality, transparency, and the pursuit of social harmony". Some distinguish between Sharia-compliant finance and a more holistic, pure and exacting Sharia-based finance. "Ethical finance" has been called necessary, or at least desirable, for Islamic finance, as has a "gold-based currency". Taqi Usmani declares that Islamic banking would mean less lending because it paid no interest on loans. This should not be thought of as presenting a problem for borrowers finding funds, because – according to Usmani – it is in part to discourage excessive finance that Islam forbids interest. Zubair Hasan argues that the objectives of Islamic finance as envisaged by its pioneers were "promotion of growth with equity ... the alleviation of poverty ... [and] a long run vision to improve the condition of the Muslim communities across the world." Some (such as Umar Ibrahim Vadillo) believe the Islamic banking movement has so far failed to follow the principles of Sharia law, or at least failed to follow them sufficiently strictly. (Note: Umar Ibrahim Vadillo states: "For the last one hundred years the way of the Islamic reformers have led us to Islamic banks, Islamic Insurance, Islamic democracy, Islamic credit cards, Islamic secularism, etc. This path is dead. It has shown its face of hypocrisy and has led the Muslim world to a place of servile docility to the world of capitalism." According to critic Critic Feisal Khan "there have thus been two broad categories of critic of the current version of IBF [Islamic Banking and Finance]: the Islamic Modernist/Minimalist position, and the Islamic ultra Orthodox/Maximalist one. ... The ultra Orthodox [such as the Islamic courts in Pakistan] ... agree with the Modernist/Minimalist criticism that contemporary Islamic banking is indeed nothing but disguised conventional banking but ... agitate for a truly Islamic banking and finance system".)

On the other hand, Usmani preached that an Islamic economy free of the "imbalances" in society – such as concentration of "wealth in the hands of the few", or monopolies which paralyze or hinder market forces – would follow from obeying "divine injunctions" by banning interest (along with other Islamic efforts). (Later in his book Introduction to Islamic Finance, he argues that Islamic principles should include "the fulfillment of the needs of the society" giving "preference to the products which may help the common people to raise their standard of living", but that few Islamic banks have followed this path.) Another source (Saleh Abdullah Kamel), (Note: Winner of the 1997 IDB Prize in Islamic Banking) described the changes anticipated for the Muslim community by following Islamic approach to economics, banking, finance, etc., as a "move towards economic development, creation of the value added factor, increased exports, less imports, job creation, rehabilitation of the incapacitated and training of capable elements".

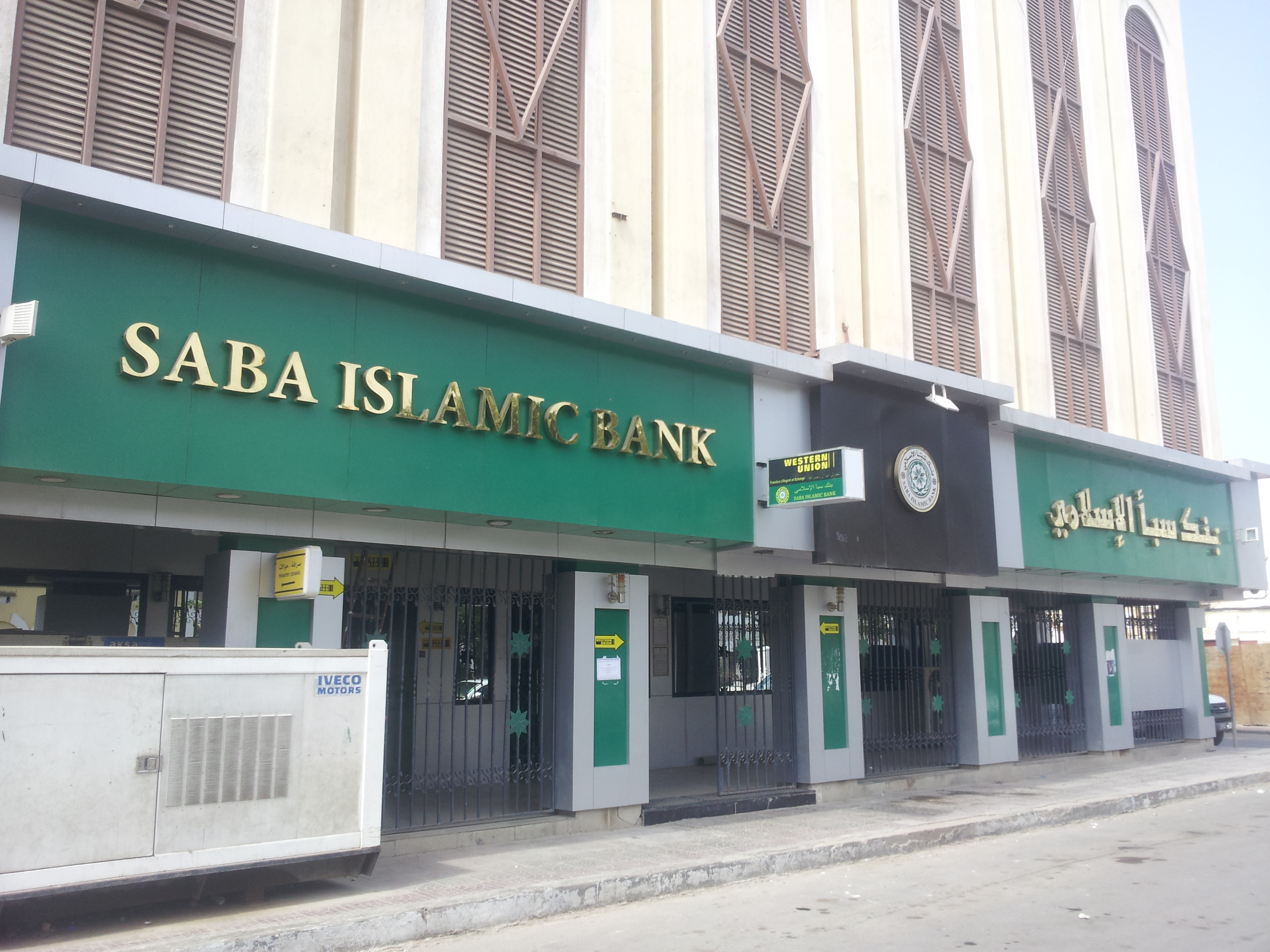
A Saba Islamic Bank branch in Djibouti City

=== Scriptural basis ===
The Sharia law that forms the basis of Islamic banking is itself based on the Quran (revealed to the Islamic prophet Muhammad) and hadith (the body of reports of the teachings, deeds and sayings of the Islamic prophet Muhammad that often explain verses in the Quran). Prohibition of gharar is based on hadith declaring as forbidden gharar, the sale of things like "the birds in the sky or the fish in the water". (Note: Several hadith, in addition to prohibiting games of chance, prohibit bayu al-gharar (literally "trading in risk", defined as sales in which gharar is the major component). Jurists have distinguished between this kind of gharar, and ghasar considered minor (yasir) and so permissible (halal), but disagree over what constitutes gharar that is minor and gharar that is substantial, (at least according to one source, Abu Umar Faruq Ahmad), have not agreed on an exact definition of the meaning and concept of gharar.) Maisir is thought to be banned by verses 2:219, 5:90, and 91 in the Quran.

However, "the Islamic evaluation" of modern banking centers around the definition of interest on loans as riba. Twelve verses in the Qur'an deal with riba, the word appearing eight times in total, three times in verses 2:275, and once in 2:276, 2:278, 3:130, 4:161 and 30:39. Riba is mentioned numerous times in hadith, including Muhammad's Farewell Sermon.

A number of orthodox scholars point to Quranic verses (2:275–2:280) as declaring riba "categorically prohibited" and "unjust" (zulm), and defining it to mean any payment "over and above the principal" of a loan. (Although at least one source states "it is commonly argued" that riba is "defined by hadith".)

Those who consume interest will stand ˹on Judgment Day˺ like those driven to madness by Satan’s touch. That is because they say, “Trade is no different than interest.” But Allah has permitted trading and forbidden interest. Whoever refrains—after having received warning from their Lord—may keep their previous gains, and their case is left to Allah. As for those who persist, it is they who will be the residents of the Fire. They will be there forever.
Allah has made interest fruitless and charity fruitful. And Allah does not like any ungrateful evildoer.
Indeed, those who believe, do good, establish prayer, and pay alms-tax will receive their reward from their Lord, and there will be no fear for them, nor will they grieve.
O believers! Fear Allah, and give up outstanding interest if you are ˹true˺ believers.
If you do not, then beware of a war with Allah and His Messenger! But if you repent, you may retain your principal—neither inflicting nor suffering harm.
If it is difficult for someone to repay a debt, postpone it until a time of ease. And if you waive it as an act of charity, it will be better for you, if only you knew.

— Surah Al-Baqara 2:275–280

According to the orthodox, an "increase over the principal sum" in loans of cash is riba. An increase over the principal sum in financing a purchase of some product or commodity is another matter. These are not riba according to the orthodox interpretation – at least in some circumstances. (These are sometimes known as "credit sales".) According to noted Islamic scholar Taqi Usmani, this is because in Quran aya 2:275 ("they say, 'Trafficking (trade) is like usury,' [but] God has permitted trafficking, and forbidden usury") "trafficking (trade)" refers to credit sales such as murabaha, the "forbidden usury" refers to charging extra for late payment (late fees), and the "they" refers to non-Muslims who did not understand why if the first was allowed both were not. (Note: Monzer Kahf argues that the Quranic verse (in 2:275) where non-Muslims complain – "... they say, 'Trade is [just] like interest.' But Allah has permitted trade and has forbidden interest" – refers to credit sales.) For this reason (according to Usmani) it is not true that "whenever price is increased taking the time of payment into consideration, the transaction comes within the ambit of interest". Instead of "principal" and "interest rate", the credit taker is paying "cost" and "profit rate". (Another difference with conventional finance is that there is no penalty for late payment.) (Note: Taqi Usmani explains that in such transactions "the whole price ... is against a commodity and not against money" and so "... once the price is fixed, it relates to the commodity, and not to the time". Consequently "the price will remain the same and can never be increased by the seller." If the price had "been against time", (which is forbidden) "it might have been increased, if the seller allows ... more time" for repayment when the bill is past due.)

=== Interest and credit sales ===
While Usmani and other Islamic banking pioneers envisioned credit sales like murâbaḥah being a limited part of the Islamic banking industry and subordinate to profit and loss sharing, it has become the "most common" mode of Islamic financing.

The distinction between credit sales and interest has also come under attack from critics such as Khalid Zaheer and Muhammad Akram Khan, criticizing it from opposite points of view. Zaheer considers profit from credit sales to be riba, the same as interest, and notes the lack of enthusiasm of orthodox scholars (such as the Council of Islamic Ideology) for credit sales-based Islamic banking, which the council calls "no more than a second best solution from the viewpoint of an ideal Islamic system". Khan calls the distinction "frivolous and laboured", a way of charging interest using another name, necessary because businesses "cannot survive where cash and credit prices are equal". Others note that in terms of standard accounting practice and truth-in-lending regulations, (Note: "Indeed, truth-in-lending regulations in the United States force Islamic and conventional financiers to report the implicit interest rates they charge their customers in such financing arrangements.") getting 90 days credit on a Rs 10000 product and paying an extra Rs 500, cost very nearly the same and is considered very nearly the same as paying in cash, using a three-month loan at 20% per annum.

Taqi Usmani, however, explains that this is a "misconception". Paying more for credit when buying a product ("an exchange of commodities for money") does not violate Sharia law, but exchange of "one unit of money for another of the same denomination" ("an exchange of money for money") and charging for credit is a violation of Sharia. The cash loan is different because "money has no intrinsic utility".

Other orthodox supporters (such as Kahf) have defended the Sharia-compliance of the practice saying that among other things, attaching commodities to money in finance prevents money from being used for speculative purposes. Critics report widespread abuses of "synthetic" murabaha, which are loans with interest in all but name.

=== Types of Islamic lending ===
One of the pioneers of Islamic banking, Mohammad Najatuallah Siddiqui, suggested a two-tier mudarabah model as the basis of a riba-free banking. The bank would act as the capital partner in mudarabah accounts with the depositor on one side and the entrepreneur on the other side. (Another pioneer Taqi Uthmani called mudarabah and another profit-sharing form of finance musharakah, the "real and ideal instruments of financing in Shari‘ah".) This model would be supplemented by a number of fixed-return models—mark-up (murabaha), leasing (ijara), cash advances for the purchase of agricultural produce (salam) and cash advances for the manufacture of assets (istisna'), etc. In practice, the fixed-return models, in particular the murabaha model, became the industry staples, not supplements, as they bear results most similar to interest-based finance models. Assets managed under these products far exceed those in "profit-loss-sharing modes" such as mudarabah and musharakah.

=== Time value of money ===
The time value of money – the idea that there is greater benefit in receiving money now rather than later, so that savers/investors/lenders should be compensated for delayed gratification – has been called one of the "most significant" arguments in favor of charging interest on loans. As such, some Islamic finance supporters have opposed the concept, arguing that some consumption, such as eating, can only be done over time, and discounting for time encourages negative outcomes such as desertification, since the desertification comes in the discounted future. However, since Islamic banking also calls for rewarding delayed gratification in the form of "return on investment" on both profit-sharing and credit sales, Islamic scholars and economists have tended to insist that time value of money is a valid concept "provided the rate of discount is the 'rate of return' on capital rather than the rate of interest," a position critics find specious.

=== Early payment of debt ===
The opposite of credit sales (i.e. the opposite of charging more in exchange for giving the buyer time to pay) is reduced charges for early payment. This is considered haram by the four Sunni schools of jurisprudence (Hanafi, Maliki, Shafi'i, Hanbali), but not by all jurists according to Ridha Saadullah. He notes that such reductions have been permitted by some companions of the Prophet and some of their followers. This position has been advanced by Ibn Taymiyya and Ibn al-Qayyim, and it has, more recently, been adopted by the Islamic Fiqh Academy of the OIC. The Academy decided that "reduction of a deferred debt in order to accelerate its repayment, whether at the request of the debtor or the creditor is permissible under Shariah. It does not constitute forbidden riba if it is not agreed upon in advance and as long as the creditor-debtor relationship remains bilateral."

=== Islamic laws on trading ===
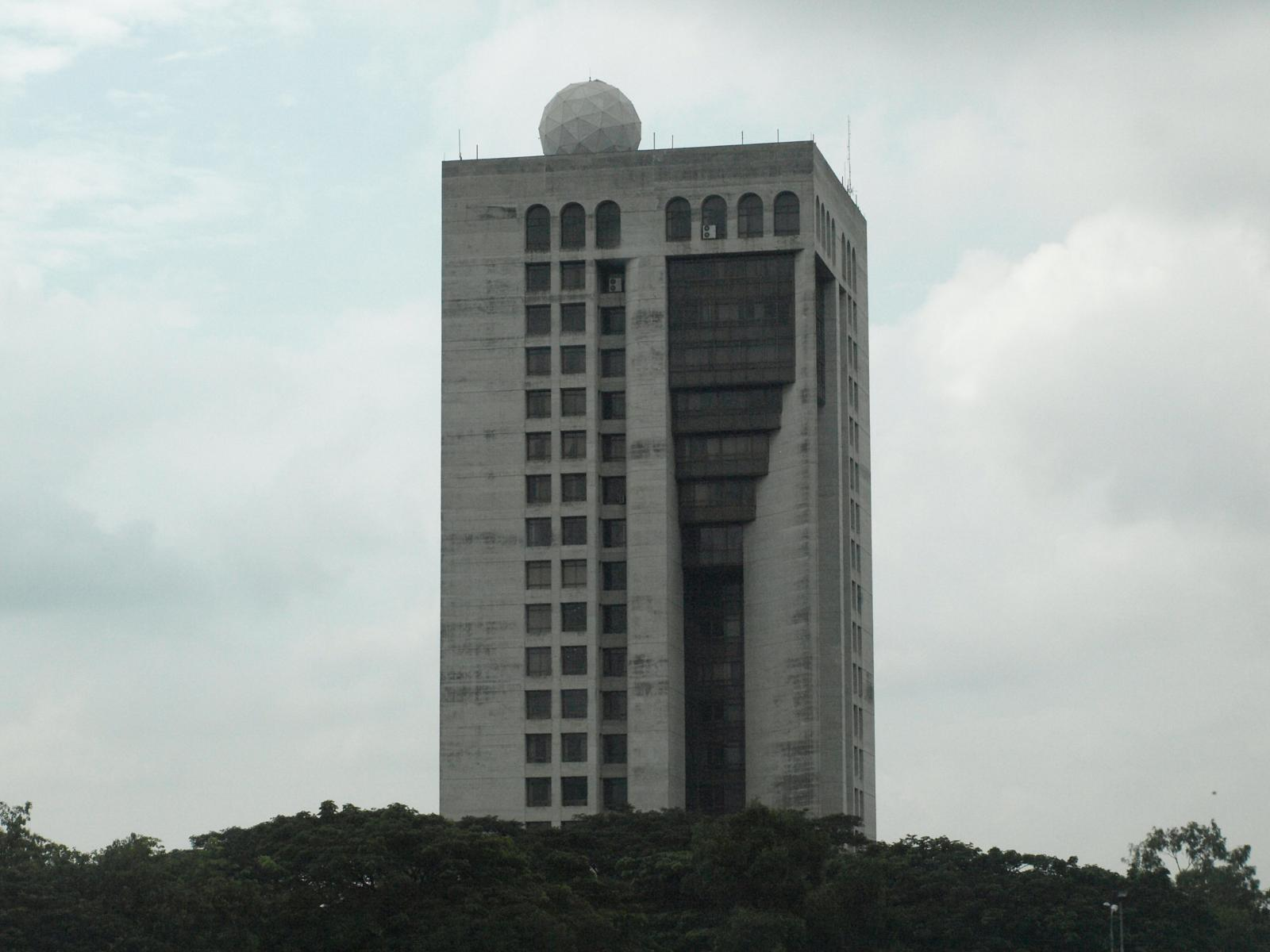
An Islamic Development Bank branch in Dhaka

As noted above, the primary focus of Islamic banking is on financing without interest to avoid riba, while trade is not an issue (per the Quranic statement that "God has permitted trade and forbidden riba [usury]". However trade transactions that involve gambling (maisir), or excessive risk (bayu al-gharar) are not permitted. Among the financial instruments and activities common in conventional finance that are considered forbidden (or at least Islamically problematic) by many Islamic scholars and Muslims are:

- Margin trading: using borrowed money to buy shares of stock or other financial instruments. It both involves forbidden interest on the borrowed money, and much greater risk than non-margin investing because losses can be greater than the amount borrowed.
- Short selling: borrowing/renting shares of stock or some other instruments and selling it, sometimes without possessing it, on the hope that it can be later repurchased at a lower price for a profit. It is traditionally thought to violate the hadith stating "Do not sell which you do not possess," and has been declared impermissible by numerous sources (Raj Bhala, Taqi Usmani, Humayon Dar).
- Day trading: very short term buying and selling of financial instruments. It has been called un-Islamic because the short period of "ownership" means day traders do not truly own what they trade, and furthermore pay interest. Among the sources calling it un-Islamic include Yusuf Talal DeLorenzo, and Focus Business Services of the UAE.
- Derivatives: contracts that derive their value from the performance of an underlying asset. (The "notional value" of the world's over-the-counter derivatives at the end of 2007 was $596 trillion and the gross market value of all outstanding derivatives was $14.5 trillion.) Options, futures and "other derivatives" are "generally" not used in Islamic finance "because of the prohibition against maisir". Sources stating that most derivative or some kinds of derivative are banned by Islamic scholars include Juan Sole and Andreas Jobst, P. S. Mills and J. R. Presley, Taqi Usmani, and Investopedia. The most commonly used derivatives are:
  - forwards: customized contracts to buy or sell an asset at a specified price on a future date. unlike futures contracts forward contracts are not traded on any exchanges;
  - futures: a legal agreement to buy or sell a particular commodity or financial instrument at a predetermined price at a specified time in the future;
  - options: contracts offering the buyer the right, but not the obligation, to buy (call) or sell (put) a security or other financial asset at an agreed-upon price (the strike price) during a certain period of time or on a specific date (exercise date); and
  - swaps: contracts through which two parties exchange financial instruments to transfer risk.

On the other hand, at least one Islamic scholar (Mohammed Hashim Kamali) finds "nothing inherently objectionable" in selling and using options, which like other kinds of trade is mubah (permissible) in fiqh, and "simply an extension of the basic liberty that the Quran has granted". Both Islamic finance practitioners and critics find benefit in at least some uses of derivatives and short selling – managing risk in times of financial trouble and improving market efficiency and employee productivity.

At least some in the Islamic finance industry use derivatives and make short sales, and the permissibility of this is a subject of "heated debate". Global standards for trading Islamic profit-rate and currency swap derivatives were set in 2010 with the "Hedging Master Agreement" (see below). A "Shariah-certified" short-sale had been created by some Shariah-compliant hedge funds. However, both have been criticized as un-Islamic.

=== Justification for Islamic banking ===
It has been praised – or at least described positively – for

- turning a "theory" into a trillion dollar "reality", asserting the presence Islam in international financial markets (according to Taqi Usmani);
- enriching the Islamic legal system by providing it with real world business questions to find shariah-compliant solutions for (Usmani);
- creating an "ethical, sustainable, environmentally- and socially-responsible" system (according to Abayomi A. Alawode);
- drawing conventional banks into the industry in search of Muslim customers (Munawar Iqbal and Philip Molyneux); (Note: "Another achievement of Islamic banking may be gauged from the fact that many conventional banks have also started using Islamic banking techniques in the conduct of their business, particularly in dealing either with Muslim clients or in dominantly Muslim regions.")
- drawing new customers and money into banking, rather than taking existing customers and their money away from conventional banking, (Laurent Gheeraert);
- creating a less risky form of finance (according to Zeti Akhtar Aziz and others):
  - by forbidding speculation, so that, for example, the excesses that led to the 2008 financial crisis are avoided (according to Ibrahim Warde);
  - and by use of two kinds of accounts:
    - "current accounts" – where funds earn no return and (in theory) are held, not invested by the bank, so not subject to risk;
    - and mudarabah accounts – where the depositors share in any losses with the bank, so diminishing the bank's risk.
- While the industry has problems and challenges, these can be explained by
  - its relative youth and low position on the "learning curve" that will solve these difficulties over time; and by
  - non-Islamic influences which can only be eliminated when the industry operates in a truly Islamic society and environment.

== Industry framework ==
Islamic financial institutions take different forms. They may be:

1. Full-fledged Islamic financial institutions (for example Islami Bank Bangladesh Ltd, Meezan Bank in Pakistan);
2. Islamic "windows" – i.e. separate, sharia-compliant units – in conventional financial institutions (for example: HSBC – HSBC Amanah, American Express Bank, ANZ Grindlays, BNP-Paribas, Chase Manhattan, UBS, Kleinwort Benson, Commercial Bank of Saudi Arabia, Ahli United Bank Kuwait, Riyad Bank); (Scholars debate the Sharia compliance of this form, according to Faleel Jamaldeen, "primarily" because of "where" the funds for these windows come from.);
3. Islamic subsidiaries of conventional financial institutions (for example: Citibank subsidiary Citi Islamic Investment Bank (Bahrain), Union Bank of Switzerland subsidiary Noriba Bank); or
4. in India, Islamic non-banking financial institutions (NBFCs).

=== Size and locations ===
Percentage of world market share of Islamic banking industry by country, 2014
Saudi Arabia	33
Malaysia	15.5
UAE	15.4
Kuwait	10.1
Qatar	8.1
Turkey	5.1
Indonesia	2.5
Bahrain	1.6
Pakistan	1.4
Rest of the world	7.3

Sharia-compliant banking grew at an annual rate of 17.6% between 2009 and 2013, faster than conventional banking, and is estimated to be $2 trillion in size, but at 1% of total world banking, still much smaller than the conventional sector.

As of 2010, Islamic financial institutions operate in 105 countries. Statistics differ on which country has the largest Islamic banking sector. According to the 2016 World Islamic Banking Competitiveness Report (see table), Saudi Arabia, Malaysia, United Arab Emirates, Kuwait, Qatar, and Turkey represented over 87% of international Islamic banking assets. A 2006 report by ISI Analytics also lists Saudi Arabia at the top and Iran as insignificant. In Qatar, Islamic banking assets were valued at $97 billion at the end of 2017, accounting for nearly 81% of total Islamic finance assets, according to QFC Authority chief executive officer Yousuf Mohamed al-Jaida. The country also announced the launch of an energy-focused Islamic bank with $10 billion capital in 2019, which would make it the biggest Islamic lender for energy projects in the world.

However, according to Ibrahim Warde, Shia-majority Iran dominates Islamic banking with $345 billion in Islamic assets, Saudi Arabia with $258 billion, Malaysia $142 billion, Kuwait with $118 billion and UAE with $112 billion. Islamic banks in the UAE also provide Islamic investment programs which are Shariah compliant. And according to Reuters, Iranian banks accounted for "over a third" of the estimated worldwide total of Islamic banking assets, (although sanctions have hurt Iran's banking industry and "its Islamic financial system has evolved in ways that will complicate ties with foreign banks"). According to the latest central bank data, Iran's banking assets as of March 2014 totalled 17,344 trillion riyals or $523 billion at the free market exchange rate. According to The Banker, as of November 2015, three out of ten top Islamic banks in the world based on return on assets were Iranian.

=== Sharia advisory councils and consultants ===
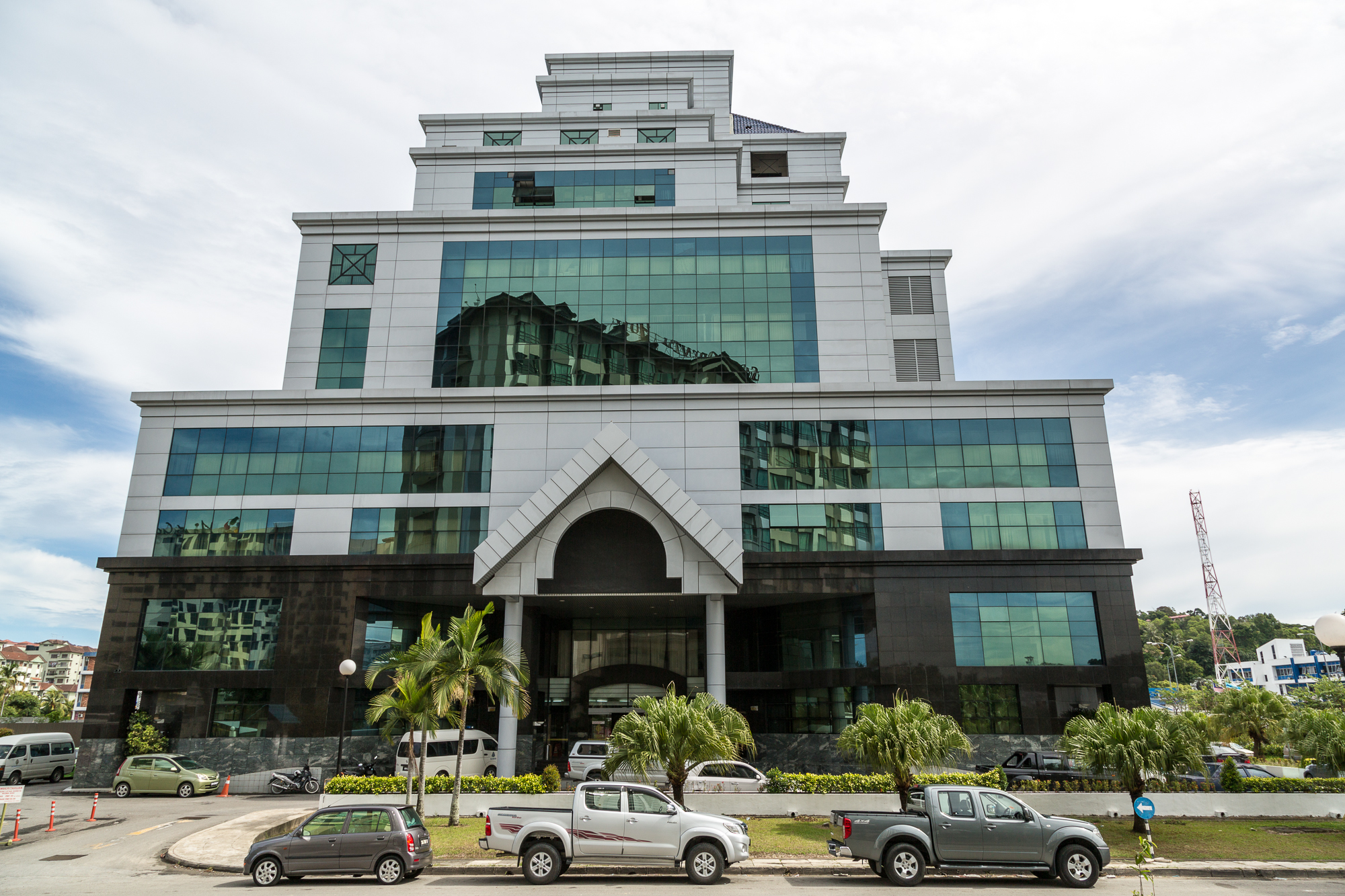
An Islamic bank branch in the UMNO building in Kota Kinabalu

Because compliance with Shariah law is the raison d'être of Islamic finance, Islamic banks and banking institutions that offer Islamic banking products and services may establish a Shariah Supervisory Board (SSB) – to advise them on whether some proposed transaction or product follows the Sharia, and to ensure that the operations and activities of the banking institution comply with Shariah principles.

According to various Islamic banking organizations some requirements for SSBs include:

- that they be composed of jurists specializing in fiqh al-muamalat, i.e. Islamic commercial jurisprudence, (Accounting and Auditing Organization for Islamic Financial Institutions, AAOIFI);
- their fatwas (legal opinions) and ruling be binding, (AAOIFI);
- that they have at least three members, (Institute of Islamic Banking and Insurance);
- that their members not be employees of the financial institution they supervise;
- and be appointed and have their remuneration set by a "general assembly" rather than the institution's board of directors, (International Association of Islamic Banks).

In addition, their duties should include:

- calculating zakat payable by Islamic financial institutions, (AAOIFI);
- disposing of non-Shariah-compliant income, (AAOIFI);
- advising on the distribution of income among investors and shareholders, (AAOIFI).

Since the beginning of modern Islamic finance, the work of the Shariah boards has become more standardized. Among the organizations that have issued guidelines and standards for Shariah compliance are the AAOIFI, Fiqh Academy of the OIC, Islamic Financial Services Board (IFSB) (2009). The guidelines and standards are not regulations though, and each Islamic financial institution has its own SSB, which are not generally obliged to follow them.

However, their home country many have a regulatory organization that they are required to follow. As of 2013, regulators in Bahrain, Indonesia, Jordan, Kuwait, Lebanon, Malaysia and Pakistan have developed guidelines for SSBs in their respective jurisdictions. Some countries, like Indonesia, Kuwait, Malaysia, Pakistan, Sudan, and the UAE have centralized SSBs. A number of Shariah advisory firms have now emerged to offer Shariah advisory services to institutions offering Islamic financial services.

=== Financial accounting standards ===
The Accounting and Auditing Organization for Islamic Financial Institutions (AAOIFI) has been publishing standards and norms for Islamic financial institutions since 1993. By 2010, it had issued "25 accounting standards, seven auditing standards, six governance standards, 41 shari'ah standards and two codes of ethics." (By 2017 it had issued 94 standards in the "areas of Shari’ah, accounting, auditing, ethics and governance".) Although it is an independent body, its "pronouncements on the acceptability or otherwise of contractual structures in relation to Islamic financial instruments are to be viewed in the same vein as regulatory edicts." Its standards are mandatory for Islamic financial institutions in Bahrain, Sudan, Jordan and Saudi Arabia, and recommended for other Muslim countries and Islamic financial institutions according to Muhammad Akram Khan. (Note: According to Oxford-Analytica, as of 2010 AAOIFI's standards are mandatory for Islamic financial institutions in Bahrain, Dubai International Financial Centre, Jordan, Sudan, Syria and Qatar.) Established in Algiers in 1990, its original name was the Financial Accounting Organization for Islamic Banks and Financial Institutions. It later moved its headquarters to Bahrain.

The International Islamic Financial Market – a standardization body of the Islamic Financial Services Board for Islamic capital market products and operations – was founded in November 2001 through the cooperation of the governments and central banks of Brunei, Indonesia and Sudan. Its secretariat is located in Manama, Bahrain. It is not a regulatory body and its recommendations are "not implemented by most Islamic banks". Faleel Jamaldeen differentiates its controlling body (Islamic Financial Services Board) from the other Islamic Financial standards organ, the AAOIFI, saying,

the AAOIFI sets best practices for handling the financial reporting requirements of Islamic financial institutions, IFSB standards are mainly concerned with the identification, management, and disclosure of risk related to Islamic financial products.

Individual countries also have accounting standards. The Institute of Chartered Accountants of Pakistan issues Islamic Financial Accounting Standards (IFAS).

=== Supporting institutions ===
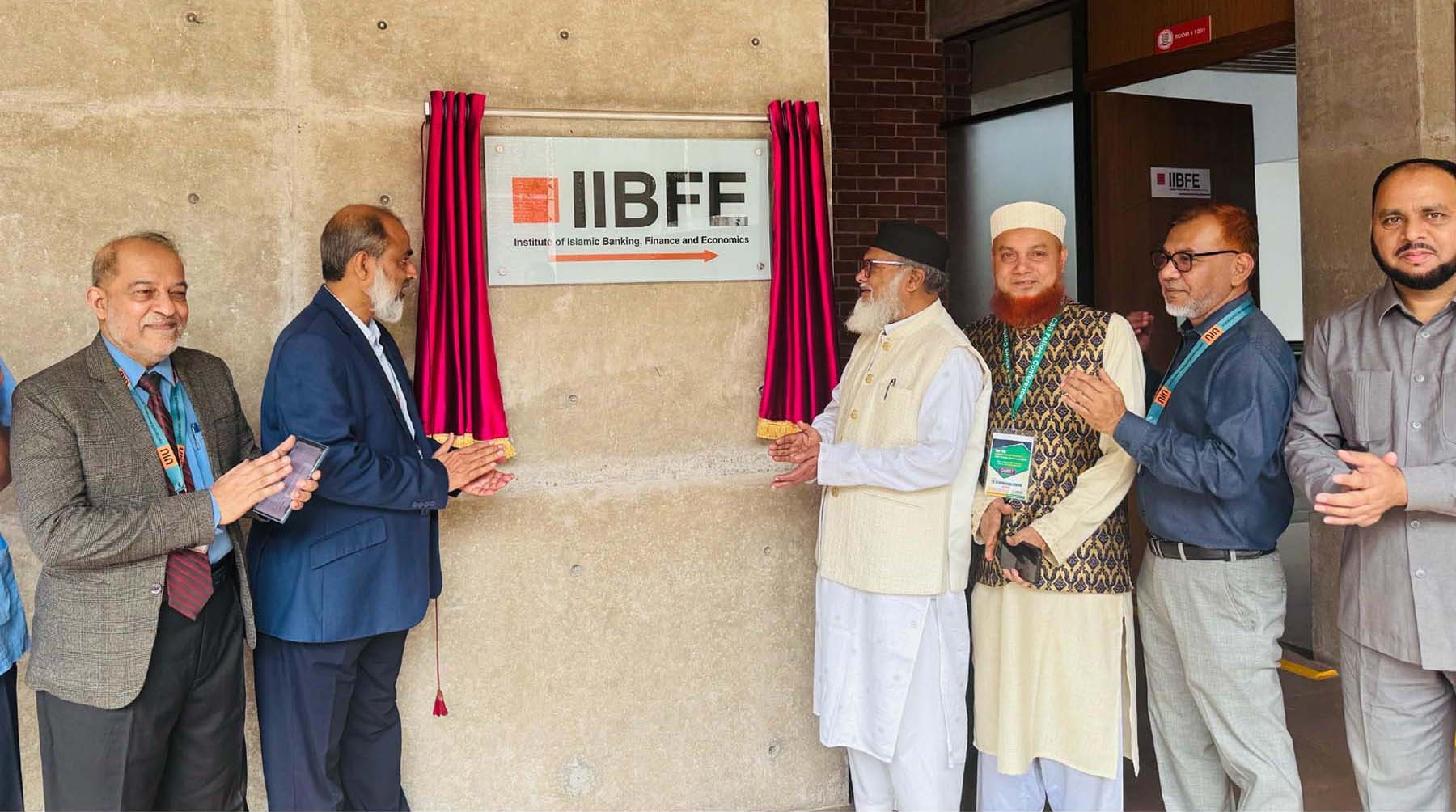
A F M Khalid Hossain unveiling the plaque for the 'Institute of Islamic Banking, Finance and Economics' at United International University, 2025.

The Islamic Interbank Money Market was established by Bank Negara Malaysia on 3 January 1994, and has developed instruments to manage the liquidity needs of the Islamic financial institutions – "funding and adjusting portfolios over the short term".

The Islamic Financial Services Board was founded on 3 November 2002 in Kuala Lumpur by the central banks of Bahrain, Iran, Kuwait, Malaysia, Pakistan, Saudi Arabia, Sudan along with the Islamic Development Bank, AAOIFI, and IMF. As of April 2015, the 188 members of the IFSB comprise 61 regulatory and supervisory authorities, eight international inter-governmental organisations, and 119 market players (financial institutions, professional firms and industry associations) operating in 45 jurisdictions. From 2002 to 2012 it issued 17 standards, guiding principles and notes. Its objective is to standardize and harmonize the operation and supervision, standards and capital adequacy, risk management and corporate governance of Islamic financial institutions in consultation with a wide array of stakeholders and after following a lengthy process. It complements the task of the Basel Committee on Banking Supervision. As of 2015 it had published 17 standards and six guidance notes.

The Islamic International Ratings Agency started operations in July 2005 in Bahrain. It is sponsored by 17 multilateral development institutions, banks and other rating agencies.

The Dow Jones Islamic Market Index (DJIMI) was established in 1999. The Index has been approved by Fiqh Academy of the OIC. It uses three levels of screening—eliminating businesses involved in activities not allowed by Islamic law (alcohol, pork, gambling, prostitution, pornography, etc.); eliminating companies whose total debts divided by their 12-month average market capitalization are 33% or more of their total sources of funds; eliminating companies that have 'impure income or expenditure' (including, of course, interest) of more than 5–10 per cent of their income or expenditure (eliminating businesses with any 'impure income' being considered impractical).

In 2006, Citigroup launched the Dow Jones Citigroup Sukuk Index. The sukuk making up the Index must be at least $250 million in size, have a maturity of at least one year and a minimum rating of BBB-/Baaa3. In 1998, the FTSE Global Islamic Index was launched. It has 15 Islamic indices for various regions. In 2007, the MSCI Islamic Index series was launched, one of the "MSCI 'Faith-Based' Indexes". It is constructed from the conventional MSCI country indices and covers 69 developed, emerging and frontier markets, including regions such as the Gulf Cooperation Council and Arabian markets.

=== Central banking ===
Although no Muslim country has yet banned interest on loans completely, suggestions have been made as to how to deal with monetary policy when central banks operate in an interest-free environment and there are no longer any interest rates to lower or raise. Economist Mohammad N. Siddiqi has proposed that central banks offer "refinance facilities" to expand or contract credit as needed to deal with inflation or deflation.

He also proposes that short term credit for the production sector of the economy be estimated by the central banks and then adjusted by manipulating the "refinance ratio" and the "lending ratio".

According to economist and Islamic finance critic Feisal Khan, a "true" or strict Islamic banking and finance system of profit and loss sharing (the type supported by Taqi Usmani and the Shariah Appellate Bench of the Supreme Court of Pakistan) would severely cripple central banks' ability to fight a credit crunch or liquidity crisis that leads to a severe recession (such as happened in 2007–8). This is because if credit was provided by taking "a direct equity stake in every enterprise" (the PLS approach) it would contract in a credit crunch. But situations like this – when financiers are "less and less sure of the creditworthiness of their financial sector counterparties" and essentially stop lending to even the biggest and most stable borrowers or even other banks – is exactly the time when credit expansion and "flooding" the economy with liquidity is needed to prevent widespread business bankruptcy and unemployment.

== Products, services and contracts ==
Banking makes up most of the Islamic finance industry. Banking products are often classified in one of three broad categories, two of which are "investment accounts": (Note: Faleel Jamaldeen divides Islamic finance instruments into four groups – designating bay al-muajil and salam "trade financing instruments" rather than asset-based instruments.)

- Profit and loss sharing modes (musharakah and mudarabah), where the financier and the customer share profits and losses, are based on "contracts of partnership". These have been called the "real and ideal" modes of Islamic finance as Islam calls for sharing of rewards and losses by all who contribute capital to a commercial enterprise (according to Taqi Usmani and other theoreticians of Islamic finance).
- "Asset-backed financing" and "debt-like instruments" such as mark-up (murabaha), leasing (ijara), cash advances for the purchase of agricultural produce (salam), and cash advances for the manufacture of assets (istisna'). These are based on "contracts of exchange", and involve the "purchase and hire of goods or assets and services on a fixed-return basis". The fixed return resembles the interest of conventional banking rather than variable profits and losses, but is called "profit" or "markup", not "interest". Originally these modes were intended by Islamic banking advocates to be "interim" measures, or to be used for situations where participatory financing was not practical, but now account for the great bulk of investments in many Islamic banks.
- Modes based on contracts of safety and security include safe-keeping contracts (wadi’ah) for current deposits (the equivalent of a checking account in the US), and agency contracts (wakalah).

Most Islamic finance is in banking, but non-banking finance, such as sukuk, equity markets, investment funds, insurance (takaful), and microfinance, is also fast-growing, and as of 2013 represented about one-fifth of total assets in Islamic finance.

These products – and Islamic finance in general – are based on Islamic commercial contracts and contract law, with many products named after a particular type of contract (e.g. mudaraba) although they are combinations of more than one contract. (Note: For example bay al-muajil instruments are used in combination with murabaha, an ijara (leasing) may be used in combination with a bai (purchasing) contract, and sukuk ("Islamic bonds") can be based on mudaraba, murabaha, salam, ijara, etc.)

=== Profit and loss sharing ===
While the original Islamic banking proponents hoped profit-loss sharing (PLS) would be the primary mode of finance replacing interest-based loans, long-term financing with profit-and-loss-sharing mechanisms is "far riskier and costlier" than the long term or medium-term lending of the conventional banks – according to critics such as economist Tarik M. Yousef – and has "declined to almost negligible proportions". Loans are permitted in Islam if the interest that is paid is linked to the profit or loss obtained by the investment. The concept of profit acts as a symbol in Islam as equal sharing of profits, losses, and risks.

==== Mudarabah ====
A mudarabah or mudharabah contract is a profit sharing partnership in a commercial enterprise. One partner, the rabb-ul-mal, is a silent or sleeping partner who provides money. The other partner, the mudarib, provides expertise and management. The arrangement is similar to venture capital in conventional finance, in which a venture capitalist finances an entrepreneur, who provides management and labor.

Profits are shared between the parties according to a pre-agreed ratio, usually either 50%–50%, or 60% for the mudarib and 40% for the rabb-ul-mal. If there is a loss, the rabb-ul-mal loses the invested capital, and the mudarib loses the invested time and effort. The sharing of risk reflects the view of Islamic banking proponents that under Islam, the user of capital – labor and management – should not bear all the risk of failure. Sharing of risk, according to proponents, results in a balanced distribution of income, and prevents financiers from dominating the economy.

==== Musharakah (joint venture) ====
Like mudaraba, musharakah is also a profit and loss sharing partnership, but one where investment comes from all the partners, all partners are given the option of participating in the management of the business, and all partners share in losses according to the ratio (pro rata) of their investment.

Musharakah may be "permanent" or "diminishing". It is often used in investment projects, letters of credit, and the purchase of real estate or property. Use of musharaka is not great. In Malaysia, for example, (Note: according to Mehmet Asutay who quotes Zubair Hasan) the share of musharaka (or at least permanent musharaka) financing declined from 1.4 percent in 2000 to 0.2 per cent in 2006.

==== Diminishing musharaka ====
Musharaka al-Mutanaqisa (literally "diminishing partnership") is a popular type of financing for major purchases such as housing. In it, the bank and purchaser (customer) have joint ownership of a purchased asset with the customer also leasing the asset. As the customer gradually pays off the cost the bank's equity share diminishes from all but the customer percentage of the down payment to nothing. If the customer defaults and the asset is sold, the bank and the customer split the proceeds according to each party's current equity.

To highlight how Musharaka al-Mutanaqisa is different from conventional banking mortgages in terms of law and practice is understood, compare it to a typical United States mortgage:

When a buyer wishes to purchase a home, she approaches the lender and requests a loan. The lender in turn, if the buyer qualifies, will lend money to buy the house, and the bank will usually set a fixed percentage of interest to be paid to the lender. Each payment to the lender will then include a return of a portion of the principal and the interest accrued on the remaining balance for that period. Over time, the entire principal is paid back to the lender, together with all the interest that is due. In terms of the ownership of the house, the buyer/borrower/debtor will have legal title to the house during the term of repayment and thereafter too. In the county title records office, the borrower will have a title deed showing the buyer as the title holder, and not the bank. The risk of the house diminishing in value is assumed by the borrower and not the bank. On the other hand, any appreciation is also assumed by the borrower and the bank cannot ask for more principal due to appreciation. Hence, the bank and the borrower know at the outset their exact obligations to each other. The bank, in an effort to secure its loan, will place a lien (a charge) on the property, so that if the borrower does not repay the loan, the bank gets the right to foreclose on the borrower's right to hold title and have the title be transferred to the bank (or the house be auctioned and the proceeds received by the bank). In the U.S., most states have a judicial foreclosure process where the bank asks the court to sell the property to recover the balance of its loan and accrued interest, plus any other costs of the suit.

The Musharaka al-Mutanaqisa differs from the US mortgage in how it addresses the interest portion of the payment from the borrower to the bank. The concept of title is critical, because the Islamic bank will still come up with the money to buy the house, but the bank will buy the house in partnership with the homeowner. Together the bank and the borrower will become "tenants in common" and the local records office will show both the bank and the buyer as joint owners. The percentage of ownership of the house at this point will be based on the contributed money ratio between the bank and buyer. Assuming the buyer paid 10% of the price and the bank paid 90% of the price, since the bank will not be living in the house, the buyer will agree to a rental payment for the use of the 90% of the property that they do not own outright. In addition, the buyer will also agree to buy a certain percent of the bank's portion on a monthly basis. Hence, the buyer pays rent for usage of house, and also to buy out the bank's portion of ownership. Since there is no interest being paid, this form of ownership (in partnership) is acceptable under Shariah. At the end of the agreed rental term, the buyer will have bought out the entire partnership, and the buyer can then ask the bank to dissolve the partnership. The recorder's office will have a new title deed recorded, whereby the bank ceases to be a tenant-in-common with the buyer, and the buyer becomes the entire title holder (whether alone or with their spouse, or any other entity as chosen by the buyer).

The essence of both transactions is different, based which entity legally has title to the house at the outset. The other difference is that the monthly payments by the buyer in Islamic banking are considered to be rent and partnership buyout payments, and not the return of principal and interest as they are in conventional banking. The Islamic bank also shares in the risk of a depreciation in the value of the house, where in the conventional banking model the bank does not take on this risk. The opposite is true also, where both the Islamic bank and the buyer gain if the house is sold for more than the book value of the partnership. In conventional banking, the bank does not benefit from rising prices.

Skeptics of Islamic banking argue that the result is the same: the buyer makes monthly payments to own the house, much like a conventional mortgage. However, as the risk of the price of the house decreasing is shared between buyer and bank in Islamic banking, it is legally distinct from the conventional mortgage transaction.

=== Asset-backed financing ===
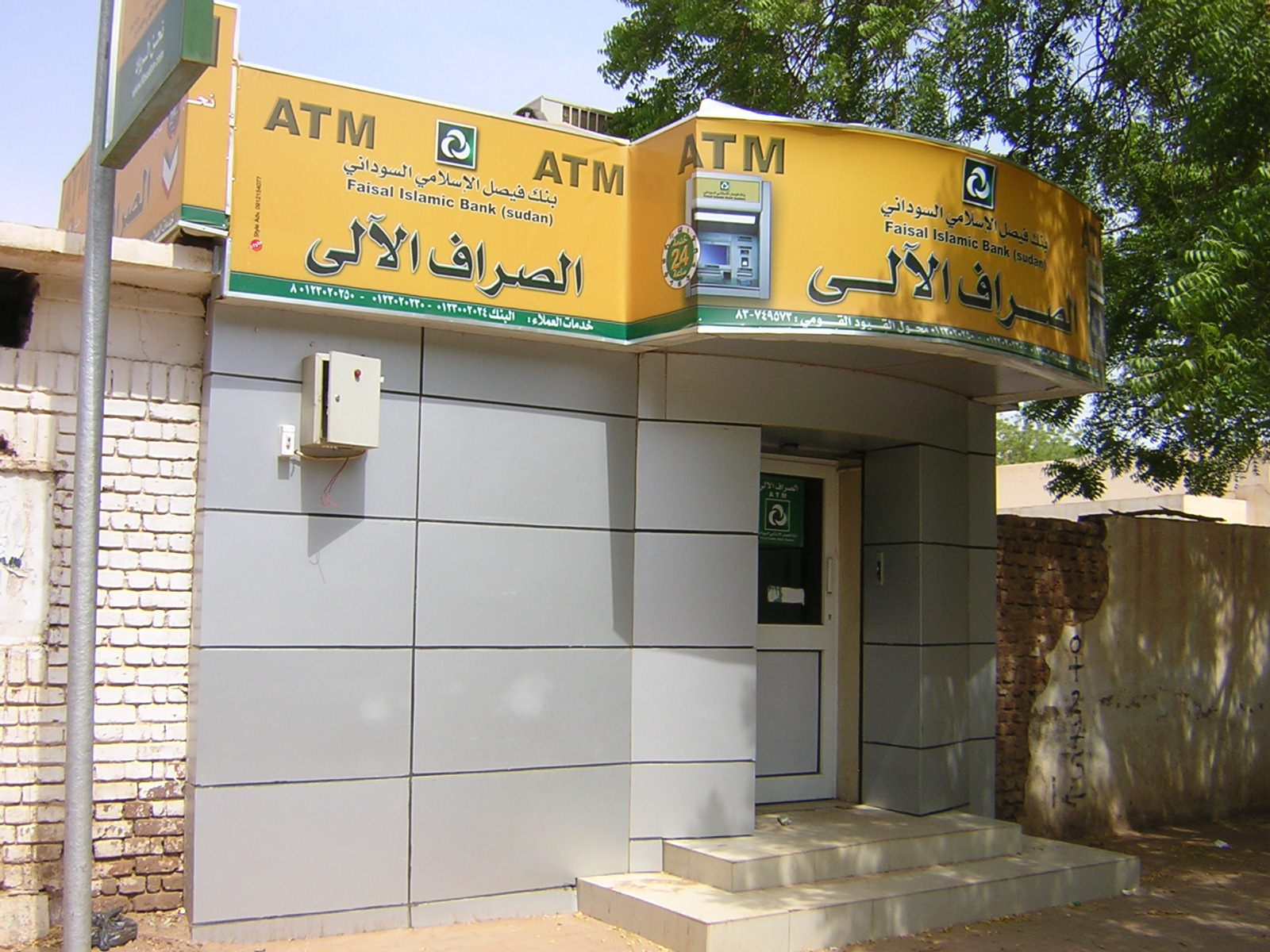
The Faisal Islamic Bank in Khartoum.

Asset-backed or debt-type instruments (also called contracts of exchange) are sales contracts that allow for the exchange of one commodity for another commodity, the exchange of a commodity for money, or the exchange of money for money. They include murabaha, musawamah, salam, istisna’a, and tawarruq.

==== Murâbaḥah ====
Murabahah (or murabaha) is an Islamic contract for a sale where the buyer and seller agree on the markup (profit) or "cost-plus" price for the item(s) being sold. In Islamic banking it has become a term for both a marked-up price and deferred payment – a way of financing a good (home, car, business supplies, etc.) whereby the bank buys the good and resells it to the customer at a higher price (informing the customer of the price increase), and offering to take payment in installments or in a lump sum.

Murabahah has also come to be the most common type of Islamic finance. One estimate is that 80% of Islamic lending is by murabahah. This is despite the fact that (according to Uthmani) Islamic finance Shari‘ah supervisory boards "are unanimous" in agreement that murabahah loans "are not ideal modes of financing", and should be used only "when more preferable means of finance – musharakah, mudarabah, salam or istisna' – are not workable for some reasons".

Murabahah differs from conventional finance (such as mortgages for homes or hire purchase for furniture or appliances), in that the fixed return with which the bank is compensated is called "profit" and not interest, and that the financier may not keep for itself any penalties for late payment. (Note: "In order to pressurize the buyer to pay the installments promptly, the buyer may be asked to promise that in case of default, he will donate some specified amount for a charitable purpose.")

Economists have questioned whether murabahah is actually distinct from debt- and interest-based finance. The fact that there is a principal and a payment plan means that there is an implied interest rate, based on conventional banking interest rates such as LIBOR. Others complain that in practice most "murabaḥah" transactions do not involve actual buying or selling of goods or commodities, but are merely cash-flows between banks, brokers and borrowers. In contrast to LIBOR, Islamic banks lend money based on their own reference rate, known as the Islamic Interbank Benchmark Rate, which "uses expected profits from short-term money and a forecasted return on the assets of the bank receiving funds".

===== Bai' muajjal =====
In Islamic jurisprudence (fiqh), bai' muajjal, also called bai'-bithaman ajil, or BBA, is a credit sale or deferred payment sale, i.e. the sale of goods on a deferred payment basis. In Islamic finance, the bai' muajjal product also involves the price markup of a murabahah contract, and a murabahah product involves a bai-muajjal deferred payment. Thus the terms and are often used interchangeably, (according to Hans Visser), or "in practice ... used together" (according to Faleel Jamaldeen).

However, according to another source, bai' muajjal differs from murabahah in that the client, not the bank, is in possession of and bear the risk for the goods being purchased before completion of payment. And according to a Malaysian source, the main difference between BBA (short for bai'-bithaman ajil) and murabaha – at least as practiced in Malaysia – is that murabaha is used for medium and short term financing and BBA for longer term.

Bai' muajjal as a finance product was introduced in 1983 by Bank Islam Malaysia Berhad.

===== Bai' al 'inah (sale and buy-back agreement) =====
Bai' al 'inah (literally, "double sale" or "a loan in the form of a sale"), is a financing arrangement where the financier/bank buys some asset from the customer on a spot basis, with the financier's payment constituting the "loan". The asset is then sold back to the customer, who pays in installments over time, essentially "repaying the loan". Since the loaning of cash for profit is forbidden in Islamic finance, some scholars do not believe bai' al 'inah is permissible in Islam. According to the Institute of Islamic Banking and Insurance, it "serves as a ruse for lending on interest", but bai' al 'inah is practiced in Malaysia and similar jurisdictions.

==== Musawamah ====
A musawamah (literally "bargaining") contract is used if the exact cost of the item(s) sold to the bank/financier either cannot be or is not ascertained. Musawamah differs from murabahah in that the "seller is not under the obligation to reveal his cost or purchase price". Musawamah is the "most common" type of "trading negotiation" seen in Islamic commerce.

==== Istisna and bai salam ====
Istisna (also bia istisna or bai' al-istisna) and bai salam (also bai us salam or just salam) are "forward contracts" – customized contracts where immediate payment is made for goods in the future (i.e. goods not yet manufactured, built, or harvested). Istisna contracts (literally, a request to manufacture something) are limited by Islamic fiqh to use for manufacturing, processing, or construction, and may be applied in these regards within the sphere of supply chain management, while salam "can be effected on anything" except gold, silver, or currencies based on these metals. On the other hand, a salam contract cannot be cancelled unilaterally, the full price must be paid in advance, and the time of delivery must be specified – restrictions that do not apply to istisna.

In a istisna contract, the financier/bank makes payments in stages, to finance raw materials (in the case of manufacturing), or construction materials (in the case of the construction project). When the product/structure is finished and sold, the bank can be repaid.

Bai salam and istisna contracts should be as detailed as possible to avoid uncertainty. Salam contracts predate istisna and were designed to fulfill the needs of small farmers and traders. Salam is a preferred financing structure and carries a higher order of Shariah compliance than murabahah or musawamah contracts.

Istisna are used in the Islamic finance world by the Kuwait Finance House and the Barzan gas project in Qatar. Examples of banks using salam are ADCB Islamic Banking and Dubai Islamic Bank.

==== Ijarah ====
Ijarah (literally "to give something on rent") is a leasing or renting contract. In traditional Islamic jurisprudence (fiqh), it means a contract for the hiring of persons, services, or the "usufruct" of a property, generally for a fixed period and price.

In Islamic finance, al ijarah usually refers to a leasing contract that also includes a sales contract. Some property, such as a manufacturing plant, office automation, or motor vehicle, is leased to a client for a stream of rental and purchase payments, so that the end of the leasing period coincides with the completion of purchase payments and transfer of ownership to the lessee. There are several types of ijarah in Islamic finance ("operating ijarah" or ijarah tashgheeliah are leases without sales and finance):

===== Ijarah thumma al bai' and ijarah wa-iqtina =====
Ijarah thumma al bai' ("hire purchase") and ijarah wa-iqtina ("lease and ownership") involve the leasing/renting/hiring of a good, paid in installments and ending with its purchase (or option to purchase) by/for the customer. Both involve two contracts – a lease and a transfer of ownership of the asset or the property – that should be recorded in separate documents.

The two modes differ in that in ijarah wa-iqtina (or ijara muntahia bittamleek) sale/ownership transfer is "an option given to the lessee" and cannot be a precondition. In ijara thumma al bai' the sale is part of the contract.

===== Ijara mawsoofa bi al dhimma =====
In a "forward ijarah" or ijara mawsoofa bi al dhimma, the service or benefit being leased is defined, rather than the particular unit providing that service/benefit. In contemporary Islamic finance, it is used to finance construction (of a home, office, factory, etc.) combined with a istisna contract. The party begins leasing the asset after "taking delivery" of it.

===== Ijarah challenges =====
Among the complaints made against ijara are that in practice some rules protecting the customer are overlooked, that its rules provide weaker legal standing and consumer protection and less flexibility than a conventional mortgage loan or car finance contract, as well as higher costs.

==== Tawarruq ====
A tawarruq (literally "turns into silver", or "monetization") is a contract/product where the client/customer can raise cash to be repaid later by buying and selling some readily saleable asset. An example of this would be a customer wishing to borrow $1,000 in cash having their bank buy $1,100 worth of a commodity such as iron from a supplier, buying the iron from the bank on credit with 12 months to pay the $1,100 back, and immediately selling the metal back to the bank for $1,000 cash to be paid on the spot. The bank then resells the iron to the supplier. (This would be the equivalent of borrowing $1,000 for a year at an interest rate of 11 percent.)

Like the bai' al 'inah mentioned above, the greater complexity of this transaction means more fees and higher costs than a conventional bank loan, but (in theory) greater compliance with Shariah law because of the tangible assets that underlie the transactions. However, critics complain that "billions of dollars" of putative commodity-based tawarruq transactions have evaded the required commodity trades; and both contemporary (Note: (Resolution 179 (19/5)).) and classical Islamic scholars have forbidden the practice. Nonetheless, as of 2012 Islamic banks using tawarruq include the United Arab Bank, QNB Al Islamic, Standard Chartered of the United Arab Emirates, and Bank Muamalat Malaysia.

=== Charitable lending ===
==== Qardh-ul hasan ====
Taqi Usmani insists that the "role of loans" (as opposed to investment or finance) in a truly Islamic society is "very limited", and that Shariah law permits loans not as an ordinary occurrence, "but only in cases of dire need". A Shariah-compliant loan is known as qardh-ul hasan (also qard hasan, literally "benevolent loan" or "beneficence loan"). It is often described as an interest-free loan extended to needy people. Such loans are often made by social service agencies, or by a firm as a benefit to its employees, rather than by Islamic banks. They are analogous to the microcredit of conventional finance, when it does not provide for interest.

Quoting the Islamic prophet Muhammad, some sources insist that lenders may not gain "any advantage or benefits" from the loan, let alone interest. However, some Islamic banks offer products called qardh-ul hasan which charge lenders a management fee, and others have savings account products called qardh-ul hasan, (the "loan" being a deposit to a bank account) where the debtor (the bank) may pay an extra amount beyond the principal amount of the loan (known as a hibah, literally gift) if the extra is not an obligation of the account/loan agreement.

=== Contracts of safety, security, and service ===
These contracts are intended to help individual and business customers keep their funds safe.

==== Hawala ====
Hawala (also hiwala, hewala, or hundi; literally "transfer" or "trust") is a widely used, informal "value transfer system" for transferring funds from one geographical area to another, based not on wire transfers but on a huge network of money brokers (known as "hawaladars") throughout the Muslim world. Hawala was not started as a halal alternative to conventional banking transfers, since electronic wire transfers have not been found to be in violation of Sharia. However, hawala has the advantage of being available in places wire transfer is not, and predates conventional banking remittance systems by many centuries.

In the first half of the 20th century it lost ground to instruments of the conventional banking system, but regained it starting in the late 20th century with the economic migration of Muslim workers to wealthier countries in the West and the Gulf and their need to send money home. Dubai has traditionally served as a hub for hawala.

Hawala is based on a short term, discountable, negotiable, promissory note (or bill of exchange) called "hundi", transferred from one debtor to another. After the debt is transferred to the second debtor, the first debtor is free from his/her obligation. Recipient of the funds often identify themselves with passwords given to them by the sender. Hawaladars are often small traders who work at hawala as a sideline or moonlighting operation. Hawaladar networks are usually family or clan-based, and enforcement of the contracts is based on these networks rather than the power of the state.

==== Kafala ====
Kafala (literally "guarantee") is called "surety" or "guaranty" in conventional finance. A third party accepts an existing obligation and becomes responsible for fulfilling someone's liability.

==== Rahn ====
Rahn ("collateral" or "pledge contract") is property pledged against an obligation. A rahn contract is made in order to secure a financial liability. According to Mecelle, rahn is "to make a property a security in respect of a right of claim, the payment in full of which from the property is permitted." Hadith tradition states that the Islamic prophet Muhammad purchased food on credit pledging his armor as rahn.

==== Wakalah ====
In a wakalah contract, a person (the principal or muwakkel) appoints a representative (the agent or wakil) to undertake transactions on his/her behalf which the principal does not have the time, knowledge or expertise to perform themselves – similar to a power of attorney agreement in conventional legal terms. Wakalah should be a non-binding contract for a fixed fee. The agent's services may include selling and buying, lending and borrowing, debt assignment, guarantee, gifting, litigation and making payments, and wakil are involved in numerous Islamic products like musharakah, mudarabah, murabaha, salam and ijarah.

An example of wakalah is found in a mudarabah profit and loss sharing contract where the mudarib (the party that receives the capital and manages the enterprise) serves as a wakil for the rabb-ul-mal (the silent party that provides the capital). (Note: (although the mudarib may have more freedom of action than a strict wakil))

=== Deposits in Islamic banking ===
From the point of view of depositors, the "investment accounts" of Islamic banks – based on profit and loss sharing and asset-backed finance – play a similar role to the "time deposits" of conventional banks. (For example, one Islamic bank – Al Rayan Bank in the United Kingdom – offers "fixed term" deposits or savings accounts). In both, the depositor agrees to hold the deposit at the bank for a fixed amount of time. In Islamic banking return is measured as "expected profit rate" rather than interest.

"Demand deposits" of Islamic financial institutions, which provide no return, are structured with qard al-hasana (also known as qard) contracts, or less commonly as wadiah or amanah contracts, according to Mohammad O. Farooq.

==== Restricted and unrestricted investment accounts ====
At least in one Muslim country with a strong Islamic banking sector (Malaysia), there are two main types of investment accounts offered by Islamic banks for those investing specifically in profit and loss sharing modes – restricted or unrestricted.

- Restricted investment accounts (RIA) enable customers to specify the investment mandate and the underlying assets that their funds may be invested in,
- Unrestricted investment accounts (UIAs) do not, leaving the bank or investing institution full authority to invest funds as "it deems fit", unrestricted by purpose, geography, or means of investing. In exchange the accounts may be "tailored to meet a diverse range of customer needs and preferences", but are not guaranteed against losses.

Some have complained that UIA accounts lack transparency, fail to follow Islamic banking standards, lack customer representation on the board of governors, and have sometimes hidden poor performance from investors.

==== Demand deposits ====
Islamic banks also offer "demand deposits", i.e. accounts which promise the convenience of returning funds to depositors on demand, but in return usually pay little if any return on investment and/or charge more fees. (Note: Deposit accounts held at a bank or other financial institution may be called transaction accounts, checking accounts, current accounts or demand deposit accounts. Funds are available to the account owner "on demand" for frequent and immediate access by the account owner or to others as the account owner may direct. Transaction accounts are known by a variety of descriptions, including a current account (British English), chequing account or checking account when held by a bank, or share draft account when held by a credit union in North America. In the United Kingdom, Hong Kong, India and a number of other countries, they are commonly called current or cheque accounts.))

==== Qard ====
Because demand deposits pay little if any return and qard al-hasana (mentioned above) loans are forbidden to pay any "stipulated benefit", the qard is a popular Islamic finance structure for demand deposits. In this mode, customer deposits constitute "loans" and the Islamic bank a "borrower" who guarantees full return of the "lenders" deposits.

However, critics (M.O. Farooq, Mohammad Hashim Kamali) see conflicts between qard's role in demand deposits and the dictates of traditional Islamic jurisprudence. Qard al-hasana loans are intended to be acts of charity to the needy, allowed lenient repayment as such. Islamic banks, on the other hand, are multi-million or billion dollar profit-making institutions, and their depositors/lenders typically expect to be able to withdraw their deposits on demand rather than be asked to be lenient with the bank.

A further issue is that at least some conventional banks do pay a modest interest on their demand/savings deposits, and Islamic banks often feel a need to compete with them, finding an (at least putative) Shariah-compliant technique to do so. The means that has been used is hibah (literally "gift"), in the form of prizes, exemptions, etc., which officially differ from the conventional banks' interest/riba in not being legally stipulated or time bound. Its use has nonetheless has been attacked by at least one scholar as the "entry of riba through the back door".

==== Wadi'ah and amanah ====
Two other contracts sometimes used by Islamic finance institutions for pay-back-on-demand accounts instead of qard al-hasanah (Note: According to Mahmud El-Gamal Classical jurists "recognized two types of property possession based on liability risk": trust and guaranty. 1) With a trust (which result, e.g., from deposits, leases, and partnerships), the possessor only responsible for compensating the owner for damage to property if the trustee has been negligence or committed a transgression. 2) With guaranty the possessor guarantees the property against any damage, whether or not the guarantor was negligent or committed a transgression. Classical jurists consider the two possessions mutually exclusive, so if two different "considerations" conflict – one stating the property is held in trust and another stating in guaranty – "the possession of guaranty is deemed stronger and dominant, and rules of guaranty are thus applied".) are wadi'ah (literally "safekeeping") and amanah (literally "trust"). Sources disagree over the definition of these two contracts. "Often the same words are used by different banks and have different meanings." Sometimes wadi'ah and amanah are used interchangeably.

Sources differ over whether wadi'ah deposits are simply guaranteed by the bank or must be kept unused with 100% reserve, with another type of contract – called wadi'ah yadd ad daman – allowing "rights of disposal" to invest but guaranteeing "repayment of the whole or part" of "current account deposit". Sources also differ on whether banks can use amanah accounts for their operations – if it "obtains" the "authority" of depositor – or not. Sources do agree that the trustee of amanah is not liable for "unforeseen mishap" (Abdullah and Chee), "resulting from circumstances beyond its control", or if there has not been a "breach of duty" (Reuters).

According to at least one report, in practice no examples of 100 percent reserve banking are known to exist.

=== Other Sharia-compliant financial instruments ===
==== Sukuk (bonds) ====
Sukuk (plural of صك sakk) – often called "Islamic" or "sharia compliant" bonds – are financial certificates developed as an alternative to conventional bonds. Different types of sukuk are based on the different structures of Islamic contracts mentioned above (murabaha, ijara, wakala, istisna, musharaka, istithmar, etc.), depending on the project the sukuk are financing.

Like conventional bonds, sukuk have expiration dates, but instead of receiving interest payments on money lent as bonds do, sukuk holders are given "(nominal) part-ownership of an asset" from which they receive income "either from profits generated by that asset or from rental payments made by the issuer". The part ownership element and (at least in theory) the lack of a guaranteed repayment of initial investment resemble equity instruments. However, in practice, most sukuk are "asset-based" rather than "asset-backed"—their assets are not truly owned by their Special Purpose Vehicle, and (like conventional bonds), their holders have recourse to the originator if there is a shortfall in payments.

The sukuk market began to take off around 2000 and as of 2013, sukuk represent 0.25 percent of global bond markets. The total value of outstanding sukuk as of the end of 2014 was $294 billion, with $188 billion from Asia, and $95.5 billion from the countries of the Gulf Cooperation Council. (Note: According to data published by the Islamic Financial Services Board.) Demand for sukuk should able to support further growth.

==== Takaful (insurance) ====
Takaful, sometimes called "Islamic insurance", differs from conventional insurance in that it is based on mutuality so that the risk is borne by all the insured rather than by the insurance company. Rather than paying premiums to a company, the insured contribute to a pooled fund overseen by a manager, and they receive any profits from the fund's investments. Any surplus in the common pool of accumulated premiums should be redistributed to the insured. (As with all Islamic finance, funds must not be invested in haram activities like interest-bearing instruments and enterprises involved in alcohol or pork.)

Like other Islamic finance operations, the takaful industry has been praised by some for providing "superior alternatives" to conventional equivalents; and criticized by others for not being significantly different from them in its use of the "law of large numbers" to spread risk, or its use of conventional corporate (not mutual) management practices.

The industry is projected to reach $25 billion in size by the end of 2017.

==== Credit cards ====
While a number of scholars (Manzur Ahmad, Hossein Askari, Zamir Iqbal and Abbas Mirakhor) have cast doubt on the Shariah compliance of any kind of credit card – or at least cards that "can offer the same service as the conventional credit card" – there are credit cards claiming to be Shariah-compliant (particularly in Malaysia, where as of about 2012 they were offered by Bank Islam Malaysia Berhad, CIMB Islamic Bank Berhad, HSBC Amanah Malaysia Berhad, Maybank Islamic Berhad, RHB Islamic Bank Berhad, Standard Chartered Berhad, and Am Islamic Bank Berhad.) These generally follow one of a number of arrangements:

1. ujra (the client simply pays an annual service fee for using the card);
2. ijara (The card is used as a leased asset. Ownership of whatever is purchased is transferred to the card user after installment payments are complete.);
3. kafala (The bank acts as a kafil (guarantor) for the transactions of the card holder. For its services, the card holder is obligated to pay kafala bi ujra (a fee));
4. qard (The client acts as the borrower and the bank as a lender.);
5. bai' al 'ina/wadi'ah (The bank sells the customer some item/commodity at a certain price and then shortly thereafter repurchases it from the client at a lower price. The difference between the two prices is the income of the bank for its services in administering the card. The customer's initial payment to the bank serves as the account balance for the credit card and ceiling limit of what can be spent. The bank's repayment to the customer constitutes whatever balance is left over after purchases.)
6. cards that act much like debit cards, with any transaction "directly debited" from the holder's bank account.

==== Funds ====
Islamic funds are professionally managed investment funds that pool money from many investors to purchase securities that have been screened for Sharia compliance. They include mutual funds holding equity and/or sukuk securities, but Islamic "alternative" funds deal in "anything from private equity and real estate to infrastructure and commodity asset classes." They began growing fairly rapidly in about 2004, and as of 2014 there were 943 Islamic mutual funds worldwide and as of May 2015, they held $53.2 billion of assets under management, with "latent demand" for considerable growth.

For equity mutual funds, companies whose shares are being considered for purchase must be screened

1. to exclude those that are involved in alcohol, tobacco, pork, adult entertainment industry, gambling, weapons, etc., but also
2. those that are "engaged in prohibited speculative transactions (involving uncertainty or gambling), which are likely leveraged with debt", by examining the company's "financial ratios" to meet "certain financial benchmarks".

Benchmarks to gauge the (equity) funds' performance include the Dow Jones Islamic market index series and the FTSE Global Islamic Index Series.

At least from 2000 to 2009, Islamic equity funds under-performed both Islamic and conventional equity benchmarks, particularly as the 2008 financial crisis set in (according to a study by Raphie Hayat and Roman Kraeuss).

==== Derivatives ====
As mentioned above (see Islamic laws on trading), "almost all conservative Sharia scholars" believe derivatives (i.e. securities whose price is dependent upon one or more underlying assets) are in violation of Islamic prohibitions on gharar. This, however, has not stopped the Islamic finance industry from using some of these instruments, and derivative permissibility in Islam is a subject of "heated debate".

As of 2013 the Islamic derivatives market was "in its infancy" and its size was not known. Contracts or combinations of contracts for derivatives include swaps and options:

===== Swaps =====
Faleel Jamaldeen describes the Islamic swap market as being composed of two kinds of swaps:

- Profit rate swaps are "based on exchanging fixed for floating rate profits". (Similar to interest rate swaps in conventional finance. As of 2007, this kind of swap had the largest market of any variety of swaps.) According to Harris Irfan, the Islamic finance market is "awash" with "profit rate swap" contracts, including a global standard developed by the IIFM and International Swaps and Derivatives Association. In Malaysia, the "Islamic Profit Rate Swap" (IPRS) hedging tool is popular.
- Cross-currency swaps are used by investors to "transfer currency fluctuation risk among themselves."

===== Put and call options =====
The Islamic finance equivalent of a conventional call option (Note: Options are a "common form" of a financial derivative.) is known as an urbun (lit. "down payment"); the equivalent of a put option is known as a "reverse urbun". In each the seller has the right but not the obligation to either buy (in the case of a call or urbun) or sell (in the case of a put or "reverse urbun") at a pre-determined price by some point in the future. These two Islamic options also have a different name for a "premium", (called a "down payment") and for the "strike price" ("preset price"). The options' Islamic distinctiveness has been questioned by analysts, and its use has been criticized by conservative scholars.

==== Microfinance ====
Microfinance seeks to help the poor and spur economic development by providing small loans to entrepreneurs too small and poor to interest non-microfinance banks. Its strategy meshes with the "guiding principles" or objectives of Islamic finance, and with the needs of Muslim-majority countries where a large fraction of the world's poor live, (Note: ("Half of global poverty reside in Muslim world ...") many of them small entrepreneurs in need of capital, and most unwilling or unable to use formal financial services.

According to the Islamic Microfinance Network website (as of c. 2013), there are more than 300 Islamic microfinance institutions in 32 countries. The products used in Islamic microfinance may include some of those mentioned above – qard al hassan, musharaka, mudaraba, salam, and others.

A number of studies have found "very few examples" of microfinance institutions "operating in the field of Islamic finance" and few Islamic banks "involved in microfinance". One 2012 report found that Islamic microfinance made up less than 1 percent of the global microfinance outreach, "despite the fact that almost half of the clients of microfinance live in Muslim countries and the demand for Islamic microfinance is very strong."

== Monetary system integration ==
Integration of Islamic banking principles with modern monetary systems presents opportunities and challenges for comprehensive financial reform. By 2012, Sharia-compliant assets had grown to over $1.8 trillion, raising the importance of how institutions interact with conventional monetary frameworks.

=== Central banking and Islamic finance interface ===
==== Dual banking systems ====
Most countries with significant Islamic banking sectors operate dual banking systems where central banks supervise both Islamic and conventional banks. Malaysia pioneered this system, which requires central banks to develop specialized regulatory frameworks accommodating interest-based as well as profit-sharing models.

The Bank Negara Malaysia has established a board, setting international standards for separate Islamic banking subsidiaries with distinct capital requirements, liquidity management tools, and supervisory frameworks. Under this system, central banks maintain parallel monetary policy instruments: conventional tools based on interest rate, and Islamic alternatives based on profit-sharing ratios.

==== Monetary policy transmission mechanisms ====
Traditional monetary policy operates by central banks altering benchmark rates, affecting variable retail rates. Islamic banking's prohibition on interest challenges this transmission mechanism.

Alternative transmission channels in Islamic banking include:

- The asset price channel works through exchange rates and equity prices.
- The credit channel impacts bank lending and corporate balance sheets.
- The profit- and loss-sharing channel works through reference rate increases raising interbank and lending rates, which restrict borrowing.

In Islamic economics frameworks, zakat helps avoid the zero lower bound liquidity trap.

=== 100% reserve banking models ===
Some Islamic economists advocate for full reserve banking as more consistent with Islamic principles.

Under this system:

- Demand deposits would be backed by 100% reserves, functioning as safekeeping services (wadi'ah) rather than loans to banks.
- Investment accounts would have depositors accept risk of loss in exchange for potential profits.
- Money creation would be limited to central bank issuance, potentially backed by gold.

=== Asset-backed money creation ===
Islamic banking's asset-backed financing offers an equilibrium between conventional fractional reserve banking and full reserve systems.

Under this approach:

- Credit creation is backed by real assets.
- Speculative lending is restricted by requirements for underlying commodities or services.
- Money supply growth becomes closer tied to real production than monetary policy decisions.

Research suggests this approach shows greater resilience, though trade-offs between self-insurance against liquidity risks and opportunity costs remain.

== Compliance with Islamic goals and Sharia ==
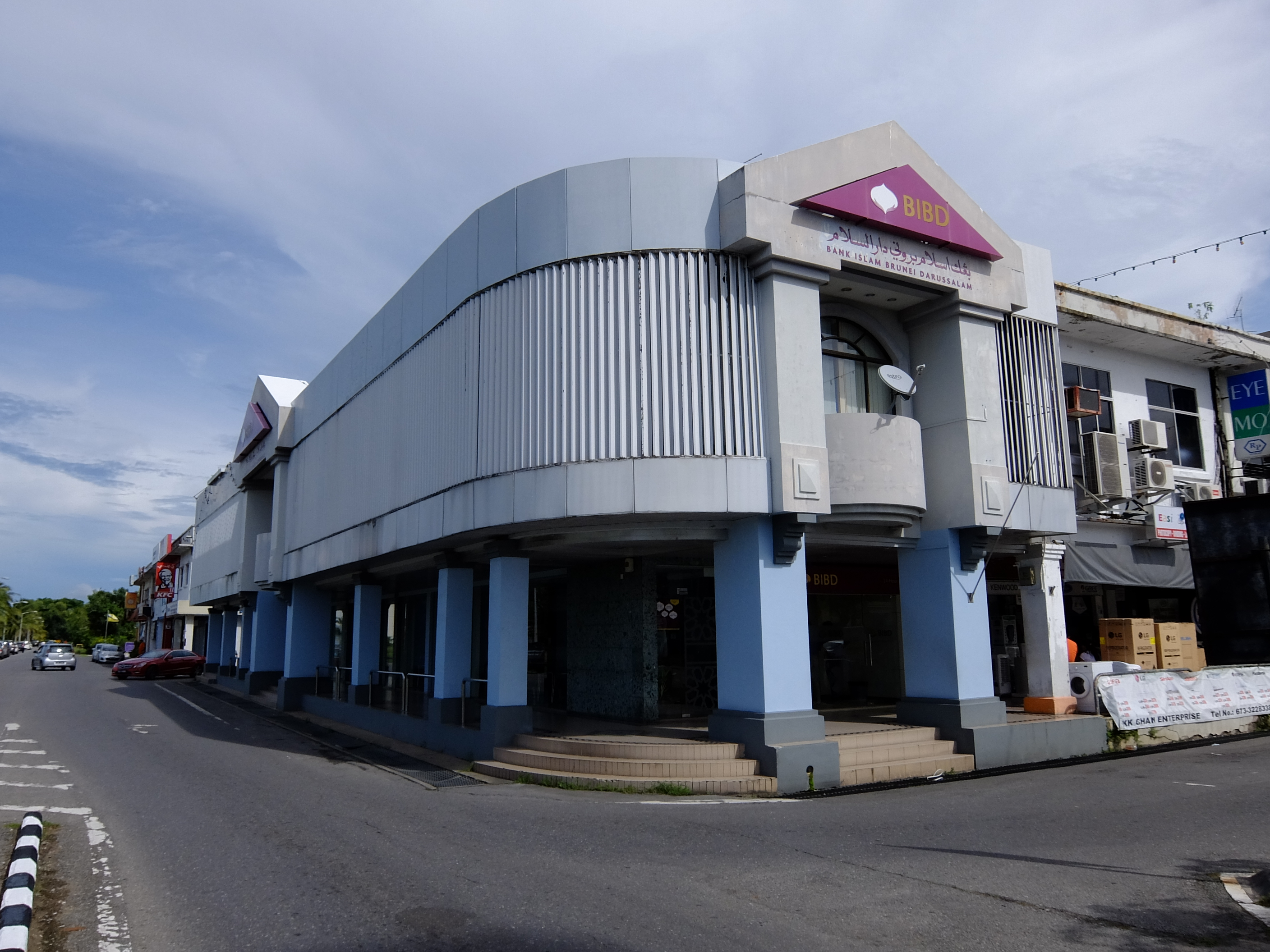
Bank Islam Brunei Darussalam in Brunei.

These are the emic (from within) issues discussed within the Islamic community for the compliance of Islamic banking and finance with Sharia and desired Islamic objectives.

=== Challenges, criticism – industry view ===
Key among the challenges faced by Islamic banking, as of 2016 (according to the State of the Global Islamic Economy Report, 2015/16 and the IMF), are:

- "low levels" of public awareness;
- a need for better regulation, better cooperation between Islamic and conventional financial standard-setters to deal with complexity and to "address the unique risks of the industry";
- a "scarcity of Shariah-compliant monetary policy instruments";
- "underdeveloped" safety nets and resolution frameworks such as Sharia compliant deposit insurance systems and "lenders-of-last-resort";
- better Shariah compliance by regulators.

Another challenge in Islamic banking has been the exploitation of poor or vulnerable people in the name of religion.

=== Challenges, criticism – scholars and critics ===
Critics have complained that Islamic banking and finance closely resembles the conventional sort but has "higher costs, bigger risks", – a situation that has not been remedied by "learning" over the decades. Other issues/complaints include a lack of policies to uplift small traders and the poor; the challenge of inflation, late payments, the lack of hedging of currencies and rates or of Sharia-compliant places to park short term funds for liquidity, the non-Muslim ownership of much of Islamic banking, and the concentration of what ownership is in Muslim hands.

==== Hegemony of hand-picked highly paid Shariah experts ====
Some Islamic banking observers believe the industry suffers from handpicked, highly paid Shariah experts who have been approving financial products using ḥiyal (legal stratagems) to follow Sharia law, "shunning controversial issues", and/or "rubber stamping" bank management decisions after perfunctory reviews, and that the banking practices approved by this small number of Islamic jurists have moved closer and closer to the practices of conventional non-Islamic banking.

===== "Fatwa shopping", independence =====
Journalist John Foster quotes an "investment banker based in Dubai":

"We create the same type of products that we do for the conventional markets. We then phone up a Sharia scholar for a Fatwa ... If he doesn't give it to us, we phone up another scholar, offer him a sum of money for his services and ask him for a Fatwa. We do this until we get Sharia compliance. Then we are free to distribute the product as Islamic."

According to Foster, this practice of "shopping" for an Islamic scholar who will issue a fatwa testifying that a banking product obeys Shari'ah law has led to "top scholars" earning "six-figure sums" for each fatwa, and to Islamic financing mechanisms that appear to outsiders to be mortgages "dressed up in Arabic terminology"—such as mudarabah, or ijarah (lease agreements).

Mahmoud El-Gamal believes that from the 1970s to the 2000s there has been an evolution of the industry towards "progressively closer approximations" of the practices of conventional banking, approved by "progressively smaller" numbers of jurists (with only a small group for example approving "unsecured lending" to retail and corporate customers through the tawarruq mode in the early 2000s). The scarcity of qualified Shariah supervisors – who need to be trained in both Islamic commercial law and contemporary financial practices – has been noted. One study found the 20 most popular Shariah scholars holding 621 Sharia board positions, creating potential conflicts of interest.

This scarcity also increases fees. Two researchers noted the small group of Shariah experts "earn as much as US$88,5000 per year per bank" and can "charge up to US$500,000 for advice on large capital market transactions." Income far in excess of what has been customary for Islamic scholars, as well as being eagerly asked for a legal opinion by wealthy, high-status people, may lead to what one writer (Muhammad O. Farooq) calls a "certain changes in viewpoint" resulting in "over-stretching the rules of Shariah".

A study of the practice of boards of financial institutions setting the pay and employment of SSB members found this arrangement "compromise(s) the independence of the SSB". Another study found Islamic financial institutions do "not have practices which ensure transparency in the role and functions of the SSBs".

==== Imitation of conventional finance ====
A number of scholarly supporters (such as Taqi Usmani, D.M. Qureshi, Saleh Abdullah Kamel, Harris Irfan) and skeptics of Islamic banking (Muhammad Akram Khan, Muhammad O. Farooq, Feisal Khan, Mahmoud El-Gama, Timur Kuran) have complained of Islamic finance's similarity to conventional banking.

Taqi Usmani argues that the industry has "totally" neglected its "basic philosophy", undermining its own raison d'être; so that non-Muslims and the Muslim "masses" have now gotten the impression that Islamic banking is "nothing but a matter of twisting documents..."

This has happened first by the sidelining risk-sharing finance in favor of murabaha and other fixed-markup financing of purchases, and further by distorting the rules of that fixed-markup murabaha (see also Ignoring required commodities below) to effectively provide conventional cash interest loans with "profit rates" that follow conventional interest rates, the "net result" being "not materially different from interest based transactions". (Another violation is the use of ijarah (leasing) without the "lessor either assuming "the liability for his ownership" or offering "any usufruct to the lessee".)

In March 2009, Usmani (as chairman of the board of scholars of the Accounting and Auditing Organization for Islamic Financial Institutions, or AAOIFI), declared that 85% of sukuk, or Islamic bonds, were "un-Islamic". Others (Hassan Heikal) have also criticized the authenticity of sukuk. Critics of Islamic banking have called it "a labeling industry" (D.M. Qureshi), (Note: at the First Pakistan Islamic Banking and Money Market Conference) or complained that the industry was "busy searching for ways to make it similar" to conventional banking, when it should be demonstrating its differences (Mohammad Najatuallah Siddiqui). (A Sharia committee at one bank – Lariba – even issued a fatwa in 1990 stating "no objection to using the term "interest" as an alternative to the term "profit" or "rate of return".) Other criticisms of Islamic finance include that:

- the industry uses "a whole host of ruses and subterfuges to conceal" rather than eliminate interest (Muhammad Akram Khan);
- the industry charges higher fees for financial products that have "all the economic features of that conventional product"Mahmoud Amin El-Gamal, (Note: a professor of economics at Rice University (United States)) and Mohammad Fadel
- the industry uses the same "formulas for SLR (statutory liquidity requirements), capital adequacy ratio, and risk management standards" as those of "interest-based banks" (Sayyid Tahir).
- it is the same as conventional banking other than in "the technicalities and legal forms", keeping interest but calling it "by another name, such as commissions or profits ...`" (A. W. Duskuki and Abdelazeem Abozaid).

===== Explanations =====
Explanations for the similarity between Islamic and conventional banking include:

- The pressure on Shari'ah boards (which serve as a sort of modern-day equivalent of the medieval "court ulama") to approve the products of institutions that pay their salaries (M.O. Farooq). (Note: M.O. Farooq cites Monzer Kahf as pointing out how the shariah board of one bank (Bank al Taqwa) defended that bank's management after its failure in 1998 "stating that ... the board of directors and the management did their best and took sound finance and investment decisions", when in fact the management had "invested in one single project more than 60 per cent bank's assets .... in violation of well-established banking rules".)
- The clash between the large demand by pious Muslims for Islamic financial products and practices, and the impracticality/inefficiency of the Islamic products and practices proposed by Islamic finance evangelists, resolved by use of highly paid (but scarce) scholars "willing to certify conventional instruments as being Shariah-compliant", and the adding of an additional layer of transaction costs on those products (Feisal Khan).
- The lack of training of Sharia experts in the deeper meaning of the Sharia, and in the long-term economic consequences of the widespread use of complex financial transactions (Farooq quoting Mohammad Nejatullah Siddiqi).
- The motivation of the evangelists of Islamic banking, which is to reassert "the primacy of Islam" rather than advance fundamental "economic change".

==== Social responsibility and emphasis ====
Following Islamic principles, "Islamic banks were supposed to adopt new financing policies and to explore new channels of investments" to encourage development and raise the standard of living of "small scale traders", but Taqi Usmani complains "very few Islamic banks and financial institutions have paid attention to this aspect". Islamic scholar Mohammad Hashim Kamali laments the focus on short-term financing by Islamic banks, this financing being "largely concerned with the financing of goods already produced, and not with the creation or increase of production capital or with facilities like factories and plants, infrastructure etc." Islamic bonds, also known as sukuk, have emerged as a new financial instrument to fund ethical transactions such as the project for the Global Alliance for Vaccines and Immunisation. To support the growth of Islamic financing, governments must establish measures to create a level playing field with regards to liquid secondary markets and equal regulation and taxes that match conventional banking.

Others:

- protest the lack of "a different type of banking which was aligned to fairness, equitable income distribution, and ethical modes of investment" (Muhammad Akram Khan).
- propose emphasizing "community banking, microfinance, socially responsible investment and the like." (Mahmoud El-Gamal).
- complain that while use of profit and loss sharing by Islamic banks is in decline, in the non-Muslim West venture capital – which operates under the same principles as darabah (minus the prohibition on haram products) – has "financed the global high-tech industry" and could potentially "bring major benefits" to poor Muslim countries seeking economic development (Timur Kuran).
- challenge the basic premise of Islamic banking, arguing that "greed and profit" are more serious and widespread causes of exploitation than interest on loans, which may not truly constitute forbidden riba in a competitive, regulated market (Muhammad O. Farooq).

The world in reality is full of exploitation: child exploitation, sexual exploitation, labor exploitation, etc. Interest is probably, if any, a small component in accounting for global exploitation. Yet, the proponents of Islamic economics and finance are fixated with interest.

Farooq cites as an example the profit (not interest) motive of the East India Company that colonized and ruled India at the expense of the Muslim Mughal Empire until 1858. He notes a lack of empirical or focused studies (as opposed to polemical fulminating) in Islamic economics on the subject of exploitation or injustice. (Note: (For example, Farooq complains there is "not a single citation for exploitation or injustice" in two substantial bibliographies on (orthodox) Islamic economics – Muslim Economic Thinking: A Survey of Contemporary Literature, with "700 entries under 51 subcategories over 115 pages", and Islamic Economics: Annotated Sources in English and Urdu by Muhammad Akram Khan. [Leicester, UK; Islamic Foundation, 1983])

==== Profit and loss sharing and its problems ====
While profit-loss-sharing modes (or at least mudarabah), were originally envisioned as "the basis of a riba-free banking" – with fixed-return financial models only filling in as supplements – a number of studies (of banks in Saudi Arabia and Egypt, (Note: Saudi Arabia and Egypt Islamic banking by Suliman Hamdan Albalawi, publishing in 2006,) Malaysia, (Note: In Malaysia, another study found the share of musharaka financing declined from 1.4% in 2000 to 0.2% in 2006,) and of large Islamic banks in general) (Note: a study from 2000 to 2006 by Khan M. Mansoor and M. Ishaq Bhatti, survey by F. Khan of the largest Islamic banks published in 2010 found PLS use ranging from between 0.5% and 21.6%.) have shown fixed-return products now far exceed profit-loss-sharing (PLS) modes in assets under management.

Explanations (offered by two authors, Humayon A. Dar and J.R. Presley), for why PLS instruments – namely mudaraba and musharaka financing – have declined to almost negligible proportions include:

1. There is an inherent disincentive for the bank's client to report profit, because the more it declares, the more of the client's money will go to the financing bank, and the less it will get to keep.
2. Property rights in most Muslim countries are not properly defined, creating more difficulties for profit-loss sharing financing than for the fixed payment kind.
3. The competitors of Islamic banks – conventional banks – are firmly established and have centuries of experience. Islamic banks are not yet sure of their policies and practices and feel restrained in taking unforeseen risks.
4. PLS is not suitable or feasible in many cases such as short-term resource requirement, working capital needs, or non-profit-generating projects such as in the education and health sectors.
5. Conventional finance has tax advantages over the Sharia compliant sort in some countries where interest is considered a business expenditure and given tax exemption, while profit (the return of PLS investment) is taxed as income.
6. There were no secondary markets for Islamic financial products based on PLS (at least as of 2001).
7. Mudaraba, one of the forms of PLS, provides limited control rights to shareholders of the bank and "creates an imbalance in the governance structure" of PLS. "Shareholders like to have consistent and complementary control system, which is missing in the case of mudaraba financing."
8. Depositors/investors of banks have proven highly resistant to accepting the periodic losses that inevitably arise in investment. (The sharing of banking losses with bank customer/investors had been advanced as a reason why Islamic financial institutions would be more stable than conventional banks.) As of at least 2004, no bad debt has translated into losses for depositors in an Islamic bank, and "no Islamic bank has ever written-down the value of its depositor's accounts when it has written-down the value of its non-performing assets" for fear of losing depositors.

Aside from disadvantages to lenders, one critic of Islamic banking, Feisal Khan, argues that widespread use of PLS could have severe harm to economies by preventing central banks from expanding credit – buying bonds, commercial paper, etc. – to prevent liquidity crises that arise from time to time in modern economies.

==== Murabaha and ignoring required commodities ====
In addition to ignoring profit and loss sharing in favor of murâbaḥah, the industry has been accused of not properly following Shariah regulations of murabahah (mentioned above), by not buying and selling the commodities/inventory that are "a key condition" of Shariah compliance (done when the bank wants to borrow cash rather than finance a purchase, though they are an added cost and serve no other function). In 2008 Arabianbusiness.com complained that there are sometimes "no commodities at all, merely cash-flows between banks, brokers and borrowers". Often the commodity is completely irrelevant to the borrower's business and not even enough of the relevant commodities "in existence" in the world "to account for all the transactions taking place". Two other researchers report that for many years multibillion-dollar 'synthetic' murabaha transactions in London took place, where "many doubt the banks truly assume possession, even constructively, of inventory".

==== Fund mingling ====
The original proponents of Islamic banking proponents for "keeping distinct accounts for various types of deposits so that return can be assigned to each type". "In practice", according to critic Muhammad Akram Khan, "Islamic financial institutions pool all types of deposits".

==== Falsification ====
Critics complain that the compliance with Sharia regulations by banks often is nothing more than taking the word of bank or borrower that they have followed compliance rules, with no effective auditing to see if this is true. One observer (L. Al Nasser) complains that "Shariah authorities demonstrate excessive confidence in their subjects when it comes to dealing with parities in the industry", and Shariah audits are needed "to bring about transparency and ensure" that the institutions "deliver what they have committed to their customers". Furthermore, when external Shariah audits are carried out, "many of these auditors frequently complain about the amount of violations that they witness and cannot discuss" because the records they have examined "have been tampered with".

==== Following conventional (haram) returns ====
Although Islamic banking forbids interest, its "profit rates" often are benchmarked to interest rates. Islamic banker Harris Irfan states "there is no question" that benchmarks such as LIBOR "continue to be a necessary metric" for Islamic banks, and that the "overwhelming majority of scholars have come to accept this, however imperfect a solution this may seem", but Muhammad Akram Khan writes that following the conventional banking benchmark LIBOR "defeats the very purpose for which the Islamic financial products were designed and offered" in the first place.

In addition, skeptics have complained that the rates of return on accounts in Islamic banks are suspiciously close to those of conventional banks, when (in theory) their different mechanisms should lead to different numbers. A 2014 study in Turkey found the long-term relationship between term-deposit rates at three of four "participation banks" (i.e. Islamic banks) "significantly cointegrated" with those of the conventional banks. According to skeptics this nearness suggests a manipulation of returns by Islamic banks to reassure customers of their financial competitiveness and stability.

==== Liquidity ====
Islamic banking and finance lacks a way to earn a return on funds "parked" for the short term, waiting to be invested, which puts those banks at a disadvantage to conventional banks.

Banks/financial institutions must balance liquidity – the ability to convert assets into cash or a cash equivalent quickly in an emergency when their depositors need them without incurring large losses – with a competitive rate of return on funds. Conventional banks are able to borrow and lend by using the interbank lending market – borrowing to meet liquidity requirements and investing for any duration including very short periods, and thereby optimize their earnings. Calculating the return for any period of time is straightforward – multiplying the loan's length by the interest rate.

While Muslim countries such as Bahrain, Iran, Malaysia and Sudan have started to develop an Islamic money market, and have been "issuing securitized papers on the basis of musharaka, mudaraba and ijarah", at least as of 2013, the "lack of an appropriate and efficient secondary market" has meant the relative volume of these securities is "much smaller" than on the conventional capital market.

Regarding non-PLS "debt-based contracts", one study found that "the business model of Islamic banking is changing over the time and moving in a direction where it is acquiring more liquidity risk."

To deal with the problem of earning no return on funds held for the sake of liquidity or because of a lack of investment opportunity, many Islamic financial institutions (such as Islamic Development Bank and the Faisal Islamic Bank of Egypt) have "been explicitly and openly earning interest on their excess funds, often invested in safer, debt-like or debt instruments overseas". Rather than forbidding this, "Shariah-experts have provided the necessary fatwa of Shari'ah-compliance based on the rules of necessities (darurah)", though they require the interest be used for "religiously meritorious purposes".

Scholars in Islamic finance and banking have invoked necessity to permit exceptional relaxations of rules. They have issued fatwas (opinions) allowing Islamic banks to deposit funds in interest-bearing accounts.

=== Other challenges and issues ===
Most Islamic banks have their own Shariah boards ruling on their bank's policies.

Management and Islamic banking

Recently, scholars have engaged with questions around leading and managing Islamic banks. This field conceptualizes Islamic banks as hybrid organizations that combine business and religious pursuits with distinct challenges for leadership to bring together diverse beliefs, values, and views.

Behavioural Islamic finance

Behavioural economists typically argue that stock prices can be substantially influenced by the mood of investors. For instance, researchers have found stock prices to be positively affected by positive events such as sunshine and upcoming holidays (Kim and Park, 1994). Ramadan is one of the five pillars of Islam, which is the religious practice of fasting from dawn to sunset during the ninth month of the Islamic calendar. Several studies, such as (Białkowski et al. (2012), Al-Hajieh et al. (2011) and Al-Khazali (2014), have found stocks in Muslim countries to yield higher returns during Ramadan compared to the rest of the year. Their results were explained by the fact that Ramadan encourages Muslims' optimism, which has a positive effect on stock price.

==== Lack of Sharia uniformity ====
The four schools (Madhhab) of Sunni fiqh (Islamic jurisprudence) apply "Islamic teachings to business and finance in different ways", and have not come closer to agreement. Furthermore, Shari'a boards sometimes change their minds, reversing earlier decisions."

Differences between boards as to what constitutes Sharia-compliance may raise "doubts in the minds of clients" over whether a given bank is truly Sharia-compliant, and should be given their business.

Judicial treatment under secular legal systems

In non-Islamic common law jurisdictions, the courts may treat Islamic finance contracts as ordinary contracts without regard to their Shariah substance. Legal scholars have also pointed to structural challenges in enforcing Islamic finance contracts within secular legal systems. Building on concerns around form-over-substance practices and Shariah non-compliance, El Daouk (2021) further contends that English courts tend to separate the contractual obligations from the Shariah-based commercial intentions of Islamic finance arrangements. This means that even if a contract is disputed on religious compliance grounds, it will typically be treated and enforced as a standard contract unless specific Shariah terms are expressly and legally incorporated. This leads to accusations that Islamic banking is 'Islamic' in name only, and that its products are effectively copies of conventional banking products.

==== Late payments and defaults ====
While in conventional finance late payments/delinquent loans are discouraged by interest continuing to accumulate, according to Ibrahim Warde,

Islamic banks face a serious problem with late payments, not to speak of outright defaults, since some people take advantage of every dilatory legal and religious device ... In most Islamic countries, various forms of penalties and late fees have been established, only to be outlawed or considered unenforceable. Late fees in particular have been assimilated to riba. As a result, 'debtors know that they can pay Islamic banks last since doing so involves no cost'.

A number of suggestions have been made to deal with the problem. (Note: At least in theory late fees may be Islamically justified if they are donated to charity. Some scholars suggest that 'the problem of bad debts be solved by a "cooperative insurance" to which borrowers contribute'.)

==== Inflation ====
Inflation is also a problem for financing where Islamic banks have not imitated conventional banking and are truly lending without interest or any other charges. Whether and how to compensate lenders for the erosion of the value of their funds from inflation has also been called a problem "vexing" Islamic scholars, since finance for businesses will not be forthcoming if a lender loses money by lending. Suggestions include indexing loans (opposed by many scholars as a type of riba and encouraging inflation), denominating loans "in terms of a commodity" such as gold, and further research to find an answer.

==== Non-Muslim influence ====
Islamic banking and finance customers, are almost all, if not entirely, Muslims, but the majority of financial institutions that offer Islamic banking services are Western financial institutions not owned by Muslims. Supporters of Islamic banking have cited this interest of Western banks in Islamic banking as evidence of the strong demand for Islamic banking and thus an "achievement of the movement". (Note: "Another achievement of Islamic banking may be gauged from the fact that many conventional banks have also started using Islamic banking techniques in the conduct of their business, particularly in dealing either with Muslim clients or in dominantly Muslim regions.")

However, critics complain these banks lack a deep faith-based commitment to Islamic banking which means:

1. that Muslims employed within these organizations have little input into their actual management, resulting in sometimes suspicion among the Muslim populace as to the diligence of Sharia compliance at these institutions.
2. that rather than a reflection of the growing strength of Islamic banking, the interest of conventional banks reflects how similar Islamic banking has become to the conventional sort, so that the latter can enter Islamic banking without making substantive changes to its practices.
3. and that these banks will be more likely to withdraw from the industry when the market takes a downturn. Harris Irfan argues that the lack of ideological commitment to Islamic banking by non-Muslim banks such as Deutsche Bank will lead to their withdrawing from the industry when the market takes a downturn. In early 2011 during the housing bubble collapse, "not a single dedicated Islamic structurer or salesperson remained at Deutsche. Islamic finance had become 'a luxury the bank can't afford'".

==== Stability and risk ====
Sources differ over whether Islamic banking is more stable and less risky than conventional banking.

Proponents (such as Zeti Akhtar Aziz, the head of the central bank of Malaysia) have argued that Islamic financial institutions are more stable than conventional banks because they forbid speculation and the two main types (in theory) of Islamic banking accounts – "current accounts" and mudarabah accounts – carry less risk to the bank.

1. In a current account the customer earns no return and (in theory) there is no risk of loss because the bank does not invest the account funds.
2. In a mudarabah account the Islamic bank carries less risk of loan defaults because it shares that risk with the depositor. If the borrower cannot pay back part or all of the money lent to them by the bank, the amount going to the depositor is cut by an equivalent amount, whereas in a conventional bank the depositor is given fixed interest payments whether or not the bank's earnings decline from loan defaults.

This means that while the bank itself may be more stable, the depositors/"partners" of Islamic profit and loss sharing accounts (Islamic banks often use the term "partner" instead of "customer" or "depositor") are exposed to risks they would not be subject to in conventional banks. Furthermore,

In these institutions, investment-account holders neither have the protection of being creditors of the Islamic financial institution, nor do they have the protection of being equity holders with representation on those institutions' boards of directors. This introduces a host of other well-documented risk factors for the institution ...

On the other hand, Habib Ahmed — writing in 2009 shortly after the 2008 financial crisis – argues that the practices of Islamic finance have gradually moved closer to conventional finance, exposing them to the same dangers of instability.

When the practice of Islamic finance and the environment under which it operates are examined, one can identify trends that are similar to the ones that caused the current crisis.... In the recent past, the Gulf region has witnessed its own episodes of speculation in their stock and real estate markets. Finally, the Islamic financial industry has witnessed rapid growth with innovations of complex Shari'ah compliant financial products. Risks in these new Islamic financial products are complex, as the instruments have multiple types of risks ...

In practice, a few Islamic banks have failed over the decades. In 1988 the Islamic investment house Ar-Ryan collapsed, causing thousands of small investors to lose their savings (they were later reimbursed for their losses by an anonymous Gulf state donor) and dealing a blow to Islamic finance at the time. In 1998 the management of Bank al Taqwa's failed, with its annual report reporting a "loss of over 23 per cent of principal to both mudaraba depositors and shareholders". (It was later revealed that management had violated banking rules and "invested in one single project more than 60 per cent bank's assets.")

The Ihlas Finance House in Turkey closed in 2001 due to "liquidity problems and financial distress". Faisal Islamic Bank had difficulties and closed its operations in the UK for regulatory reasons. According to The Economist, "Dubai's debt crisis in 2009 showed that sukuk [Islamic bonds] can help to inflate debt to unsustainable levels."

===== Recessions =====
During the Great Recession, Islamic banks "on average, showed stronger resilience" than conventional banks, but "faced larger losses" when the crisis hit "the real economy," according to a 2010 IMF survey.

At the beginning of the Great Recession, Islamic banks were "unscathed", leading to one Islamic banking supporter to write that the collapse of leading Wall Street institutions, particularly Lehman Brothers, "should encourage economists world-wide to focus on Islamic banking and finance as an alternative model." However, gradually the effect of the financial downturn moved to the real sector, affecting Islamic banking. According to Ibrahim Warde, "this showed that Islamic finance was not all a panaceas, and that a faith-based system is not automatically immune to the vagaries of the Financial system."

===== Concentration of ownership =====
Concentrated ownership is another danger to the stability of Islamic banking and finance. Munawar Iqbal and Philip Molyneux write that only

"three or four families own a large percentage of the industry. ... This concentration of ownership could result in substantial financial instability and possible collapse of the industry if anything happens to those families, or the next generation of these families change their priorities. Similarly, the experience of country-wide experiments has also been mostly on the initiatives of rulers not elected through popular votes."

===== Macroeconomic exposures =====
Harris Irafan warns that the "macroeconomic exposures" of Islamic banks constitute a "ticking time bomb" of "billions of dollars" in "unhedged currencies and rates". The difficulty, complexity and expense of hedging these in the correct Islamic manner is such that as of 2015, the Islamic Development Bank "was hemorrhaging cash as if it were funding a war. It simply couldn't swap dollars for euros or vice versa on an ongoing basis without resorting to the conventional markets." Regional Islamic banks in the Middle East and Malaysia did not have "specialized personnel trained to understand and negotiate Sharia-compliant treasury swaps" and were not willing to hire consultants who did.

==== Customers and the industry ====
The majority of Islamic banking clients are found in the Gulf states and in developed countries. Studies of Islamic banking customers in Malaysia and Pakistan found customer satisfaction was connected to service quality. A study of Islamic banking customers in Bangladesh found "most customers" were between 25 and 35 years old, "highly educated" and having a "durable relationship" with the bank, and more knowledgeable about account than financing products.

In a series of interviews conducted in 2008 and 2010 with Pakistani banking professionals (conventional and Islamic bankers, Shariah banking advisors, finance-using businessmen, and management consultants), economist Feisal Khan noted many Islamic bankers expressed "cynicism" over the difference or lack thereof between conventional and Islamic bank products, the lack of requirements for external Shariah-compliance audits of Islamic banks in Pakistan, and Shariah boards' lack of awareness of their banks' failure to follow Shariah compliant practices or their power to stop these practices. However this did not deter patronage of the banks by the pious (one of whom explained that if his Islamic bank was not truly Shariah compliant, 'The sin is on their head now, not on mine! What I could do, I've done.')

The Bank of London and the Middle East (BLME) have majority non-Muslim customers that receive a fixed percentage of profits, rather than an interest rate. However, critics say that Sharia deposits and products are too similar to interest-rate related products, in contrast to the share of profits earned. Other explanations for the rise of non-Muslim customers in Islamic banking have been pointed towards ethical reasons in negative screening of investments like tobacco, alcohol, and arms.

One estimate of customer preference (given by a Pakistani banker) in the Pakistani banking industry was that about 10% of customers were "strictly conventional banking clients", 20% were strictly Shariah-compliant banking clients, and 70% would prefer Shariah-compliant banking but would use conventional banking if "there was a significant pricing difference". A survey of Islamic and conventional banking customers found that Islamic banking customers were more observant (having attended hajj, observing salat, growing a beard, etc.), but also had higher savings account balances than conventional bank customers, were older, better educated, had traveled more overseas, and tended to have a second account at a conventional bank. (Note: Survey of 5133 bank customers of 30 branches of an Islamic and a conventional bank led by Ayesha Khalid Khan.) Another study, using "official data" reported to State Bank of Pakistan, found that for lenders who had taken out both Islamic (murabaha) financing and conventional loans, the default rate was more than twice as high on the conventional loans. Borrowers were "less likely to default during Ramadan and in big cities if the share of votes to religious-political parties increases, suggesting that religion – either through individual piousness or network effects – may play a role in determining loan default." (Note: A study of "conventional and Islamic loans using a comprehensive monthly dataset from Pakistan that follows more than 150,000 loans over the period 2006:04 to 2008:12".)

==== Costs ====
Muhammad El-Gamal argues that because Islamic financial products imitate conventional financial products but operate in accordance with the rules of Shariah, different products will require additional jurist and lawyer fees, "multiple sales, special-purpose vehicles, and documentations of title". In addition there will be costs associated with "the peculiar structure that Islamic banks use for late payment penalties". Consequently, their financing tends to cost more than, and/or accounts pay less return than conventional products.

El-Gama also argues that another source of inefficiency/greater expense in Islamic banking and a reason its replications of conventional finance are "always one step behind" new financial products in the conventional industry is the industry's dependence on "classical "nominate contracts" (murabahah credit sales, ijarah leases, etc.). These contracts follow classical texts and were created in a time when financial markets were very limited. They are not equipped to "disentangle various risks" that "modern" financial markets and institutions (such as "money markets, capital markets, options markets, etc.") are so designed. On the other hand, making their contracts/products more efficient will alienate the pious customer base that wants contracts/products to follow classical forms.

Most studies have found Islamic banks less efficient on average than conventional ones.

- According to a 2006 report by M. Kabir Hassan of 43 bank in 21 Muslim countries from 1996 to 2001, "on average, the Islamic banking industry is relatively less efficient compared to their conventional counterparts in other parts of the world";
- A study of banks in Malaysia from 1997 to 2003 found Islamic banks somewhat less efficient, on average, than their conventional counterparts, as did a study of Islamic banks in Turkey from 1999 to 2001.
- In contrast, one multi-country study (43 Islamic and 37 conventional banks in 21 countries), covering a similar time period (1999–2005) as the studies above, found no "significant differences" in overall efficiency.

In one important part of the finance market, home buying, Islamic finance has not been able to compete with conventional finance in at least some countries (the UK as of 2002, and the US and Canada as of 2009). According to Humayon Dar, the monthly payments for a Shariah compliant "Lease Contract" used by Islamic Investment Banking Unit of Ahli United Bank Kuwait in Britain "are much higher" than equivalent conventional mortgages. In Canada the cost of Islamic home finance was 100 to 300 basis points higher than conventional home finance, and in the U.S. 40 to 100 basis points higher, according to Hans Visser. (Visser credits the higher cost of Islamic ijarah financing to its higher risk weighting compared to conventional mortgages under the Basel I and Basel II international standards of minimum capital requirements for banks.)

==== Maturity ====
According to M. O. Farooq, "common explanations offered by" the Islamic finance movement for the Islamic banking industry shortcomings are that

1. industry problems and challenges are part of a "learning curve" and will be solved over time;
2. and that unless and until the industry operates in an Islamic society and environment it will be hindered by non-Islamic influences and won't "operate in its essence".

While the veracity of the second explanation can not be verified before a complete Islamic society is established, Feisal Khan points out in regard to the first defense that it has been over twenty years (1993) since one critic (Timur Kuran) first highlighted the industry's problems (the basic similarity of Islamic banking in practice to the conventional, the marginalizing of the equity-based, risk-sharing modes and embrace of short-term products and debt-like instruments), and since a supporter (Ausaf Ahmad) defended the industry as early in its transition from conventional banking.

Seventeen years later, Ibrahim Warde, an Islamic finance proponent, lamented that "rather than disappearing, murabaha and comparable sale-based products grew significantly and today they constitute the bulk of the activity of most Islamic Banks..."

Most critics of the Islamic banking industry call for further orthodoxy and a redoubling of effort to strictly enforce Sharia. (Note: such as Muhammad Taqi Usmani, Saleh Abdullah Kamel and Harris Irfan) Some (M. O. Farooq and M. A. Khan), have blamed the industry problems on its condemnation of any and all interest on loans as forbidden riba, and the impracticality of attempting to enforce this prohibition.

==== Lack of conformance with Islamic financial principles ====
Critic Feisal Khan argues that in many ways Islamic finance has not lived up to its defining characteristics. Risk-sharing is lacking because profit and loss sharing modes are so infrequently used. Underlying material transactions are also missing in such transactions as "tawarruq, commodity murabahas, Malaysian Islamic private debt securities, and Islamic short-sales". Exploitation is involved when high fees are charged for "doing nothing more substantial than mimicking conventional banking /finance products". Haram activities are not avoided when banks (following the customary practice) simply take the word of clients/financees/borrowers that they will not use funds for un-Islamic activities.

== Etic (from outside) and universal issues ==
=== Lack of compliance with global standards ===
The International Monetary Fund (IMF) has highlighted the risk of Islamic banking and finance's lack of common understanding of money laundering (ML) and terrorism financing (TF) and resultant noncompliance such as with Financial Action Task Force on Money Laundering (FATF) recommendations. Some of the ML/TF risks related to Islamic finance are similar to conventional financing, but there is an unknown and large number of unknown risks and issues. These risks are caused by the complexity of Islamic finance products as well as the nature of the relationship between the Islamic banks and stakeholders. Since there is limited experience and capability within the Islamic banking and finance system for the risk mitigation and compliance with global ML/TF standards, the risks are magnified. These risks become critical in case of vulnerable, non-compliant or rogue nations and organisations. "The FATF standards are implemented without any form of tailoring to the specificities of Islamic finance. The FATF, the Islamic finance standard-setters, and the national regulators should seek a greater understanding of the specific ML/TF risks that may arise in Islamic finance and develop an appropriate response."

== See also ==
Related Islamic topics

- Economy of the OIC
- Islamic economics
- Islamic finance products, services and contracts
- Muamalat
- Riba
- Murabaha
- Sharia and securities trading

Non-Islamic topics

- Fractional-reserve banking
- UIF Corporation
- History of banking
- Micro venture capital
- Mont de Piété
- Profit and loss sharing
- Credit union
