= Islamic International Ratings Agency =

Financial rating agency

The Islamic International Ratings Agency (IIRA) is a financial rating agency that evaluates capital markets and the banking sectors of predominantly Muslim countries around the world. Its methods involve a rating spectrum that includes a full array of capital instruments and specialty financial products.

== History ==
The IIRA was founded in the Kingdom of Bahrain in 2002 but did not begin operating until 2005. It was established to provide support for the Islamic Development Bank’s conception of Islamic finance. It is one of the four international bodies that support the Islamic financial industry along with the Islamic Financial Services Board (IFSB), Accounting and Auditing Organization for Islamic Financial Institutions (AAOIFI), and the International Islamic Financial Market (IIFM).

The IIRA is recognized by several international jurisdictions, which include the Central Bank of Bahrain, Central Bank of Jordan, and the Turkey-based Banking Regulation and Supervision Agency. The ratings agency, which also rates corporate governance of financial institutions, has to compete with other international rating agencies. However, it is the sole ratings agency for the ICM, financial services, and banking sectors.

== Functions ==
The IIRA provides assessments according to the principles of Islamic finance and focuses on the development of local capital markets in member-countries of the Organization of Islamic Countries (OIC). This means that its assessments are in compliance with the Sharia principles. The IIRA sparked debate during its early years due to its focus on this assessment and announced it would only provide credit ratings in the future, which it now performs. In addition, aside from Shari’a ratings, the agency began offering benchmarks for issue and issuer ratings, ratings for timely repayments of debt obligations for corporations and banks.

== Organization ==
Structured as an independent organization, the IIRA has a board of directors as well as a completely independent rating committee. It also has a Sharia supervisory board. The Islamic Development Bank is a prominent shareholder, maintaining control over the institution through the Chairman of the Board of Directors, who it nominates. Together with its affiliates, it maintains a 42 percent stake. Other stakeholders include the Malaysian Rating Corporation, and Pakistan's JCR-VIS Credit Rating Company, among others.
