= Timeline of Samarra =

The following is a timeline of the history of the city of Samarra, Iraq.

== Prior to 16th century ==
- 836 – Samarra established and the Abbasid caliph Al-Mu'tasim relocated capital from Baghdad to Samarra.
- 848 – Great Mosque of Samarra built
- 859 – Abu Dulaf Mosque built
- 861 – 11 December: Caliph Al-Mutawakkil assassinated.
- 868 – The Islamic scholar and the 10th imam from the Twelve Imams Ali al-Hadi died in Samarra on 21 June.
- 861 – 870 Caliphal Civil War, was an armed conflict during the "Anarchy at Samarra"
- 874 – The Islamic scholar and the 11th imam from the Twelve Imams Hasan al-Askari died in Samarra on 4 January
- 892 – Abbasid caliph Al-Mu'tamid relocated capital to Baghdad from Samarra.
- 1258 – Samarra occupied by Mongol Empire forces

== 16th–19th centuries ==
- 1508 – Shah of Iran Ismail I visited Al-Askari Shrine after his army had occupied Samarra city
- 1553 – The Ottoman admiral Seydi Ali Reis visited Al-Askari Shrine in the town
- 1705 – The Ottoman governor of Baghdad Hassan Pasha visited Al-Askari Shrine in the town
- 1733 – Battle of Samarra between Safavid Empire and Ottoman Empire on July 19 and Ottoman Empire got victory
- 1785 – The Wall of Samarra built around the city
- 1870 – Shah of Qajar Iran Naser al-Din Shah visited Al-Askari Shrine
- 1874 – September: the Iraqi Shia marja Mirza Shirazi moved to Samarra and spent his life there
- 1878 – The first bridge built at the Tigris in the city.
- 1881 – The first elementary school opened
- 1890 – Mirza Shirazi's Hawza established
- 1895 – 20 February: The Iraqi Shia marja' Mirza Shirazi died in Samarra and burial in Imam Ali shrine in Najaf

== 20th century ==
- 1917 – Samarra occupied by British forces on 23 April
- 1936 – The Wall of Samarra removed
- 1956 – Samarra Dam opened after three years had constructed
- 1965 – The State Company for Drugs Industry and Medical Appliances established .
- 1973 – Samarra FC (football club) formed.

== 21st century ==
- 2004 – Battle of Samarra on October.
- 2006 – al-Askari mosque bombing on 22 February
- 2007 – al-Askari mosque bombing on 13 June
- 2011 – 12 February : bombing
- 2012 – University of Samarra established.
- 2014 – Battle of Samarra on June
