= Shuja al-Khwarazmi =

Mother of Abbasid caliph Al-Mutawakkil

Shuja شجاع

Umm walad of the Abbasid caliph
- Period: 822 – 5 January 842
- Born: Khwarazm, Abbasid Caliphate
- Died: June/July 861 al-Ja'fariyyah, Samarra, Abbasid Caliphate
- Burial: Samarra
- Spouse: Al-Mu'tasim
- Children: Al-Mutawakkil
Names
- Shuja Umm Jaʽfar al-Mutawakkil
- Religion: Islam
- Occupation: Landowner

Shuja al-Khwarazmi also known as Umm Jaʽfar (Arabic: أم جعفر) or Umm al-Mutawakkil (Arabic: أم المتوكل) was one of the Umm walads of eighth Abbasid caliph al-Mu'tasim and mother of al-Mutawakkil.

Shuja was the concubine of Abbasid prince Muhammad. She entered the abbasid harem probably in 819/820. She was raised in the Abbasid household before Abbasid prince Abu Ishaq Muhammad ibn Harun kept her as a concubine. She was related to Musa ibn Bugha the Elder. The meaning of her name was Brave and Courageous. She gave birth to Muhammad's son Jafar (future Al-Mutawakkil).

Al-Mutawakkil was born on February/March 822 to the Abbasid prince Abu Ishaq Muhammad (the future al-Mu'tasim) his concubine from Khwarazm called Shuja. She was of Turkic origin

The Early life of Shuja is unclear because the Early life of Al-Mutawakkil is obscure, as he played no role in political affairs until the death of his older half-brother, al-Wathiq, in August 847. When her son became Caliph, he gave his mother Shuja, a degree of financial power to the extent that she had about 500,000 dinar and several pieces of land; however, there is no mention in sources that she had any political power. Shortly after her son became Caliph, Shuja decided to perform hajj.

Shuja was generous, when she went on the pilgrimage, Al-Mutawakkil accompanied her to bid her goodbye. When she reached Kufa she ordered that each of the Abbasid (descendants of Abbas) and the Talibid men (descendants of Abu Talib) were to receive one thousand dinars while every women was to receive five hundred dinars, while every men from Al-Muhajirin was to receive a hundred dinars, while every women was to receive ten dinars. She left behind fifty thousand dinars and more than a million dinar worth jewelry.

Shuja died around June–July 861, mostly probably she died on 19 June 861 in al-Ja'fariyyah, Samarra. Her elder grandson, prince al-Muntasir, offered the funeral prayer and she was buried in the Friday Mosque. Her wealth was inherited by her grandchildren.

== Family ==
Shuja was related to several important Abbasid caliphs and princes:

No.	Abbasids	Relation
1	Al-Mutawakkil	Son
2	Al-Muntasir	Elder grandson
3	Al-Muwaffaq	Grandson
4	Al-Mu'tamid	Grandson
5	Al-Mu'tazz	Grandson
6	Al-Mu'ayyad	Grandson
7	Isma'il	Grandson
8	Abu al-Hassan	Grandson
9	Abu Isa	Grandson
10	Ishaq	Youngest grandson
11	Umm Abdallah	Granddaughter
12	Faridah	Daughter-in-law

== Sources ==
- Masudi (2010) [1989]. The Meadows of Gold: The Abbasids. Translated by Paul Lunde and Caroline Stone. London and New York: Routledge. ISBN 978-0-7103-0246-5.
- Kennedy, Hugh (1993). "al-Mutawakkil ʿAlā 'llāh". In Bosworth, C. E.; van Donzel, E.; Heinrichs, W. P. & Pellat, Ch. (eds.). The Encyclopaedia of Islam, Second Edition. Volume VII: Mif–Naz. Leiden: E. J. Brill. pp. 777–778. doi:10.1163/1573-3912_islam_SIM_5658. ISBN 978-90-04-09419-2.
- El-Azhari, Taef (2019). Queens, Eunuchs, and Concubines in Islamic History, 661-1257. Edinburgh: Edinburgh University Press. ISBN 978-1-4744-2319-9.
- The rules about women. Jamal Al-Din Abi Al-Faraj Abdul Rahman. 2013
- Kraemer, Joel L., ed. (1989). The History of al-Ṭabarī, Volume XXXIV: Incipient Decline: The Caliphates of al-Wāthiq, al-Mutawakkil and al-Muntaṣir, A.D. 841–863/A.H. 227–248. SUNY Series in Near Eastern Studies. Albany, New York: State University of New York Press. ISBN 978-0-88706-874-4.

Shuja al-Khwarazmi Abbasid harem Born: 810s Died: June/July 861
Preceded by Qaratis	Deputy head of the Harem; 847 – June/July 861	Succeeded by Hubshiya
