= Shariyah =

Shariyah may refer to:

- Shāriyah (c. 815–870), poet and musician
- Sharia
