= Fadl al-Sha'irah =

Arab female poet of the Abbasid era (d. 870)

Fadl al-Shaʻirah فضل الشاعرة
- Born: Al-Yamama, Abbasid Caliphate
- Died: c. 870/871; Samarra, Abbasid Caliphate
- Resting place: Samarra
- Occupation: Poet
- Spouse: al-Mutawakkil
- Writing career
- Pen name: Fadl
- Language: Arabic
- Period: Islamic Golden Age (Early Abbasid era)

Fadl al-Qaysi or Faḍl al-Shāʻirah (Arabic: فضل الشاعرة; "Faḍl the Poet"; d. 871) was one of "three early ʻAbbasid singing girls, particularly famous for their poetry" and is one of the pre-eminent medieval Arabic female poets whose work survives. She was a concubine of caliph Al-Mutawakkil.

== Life ==
Born in al-Yamama (now in Saudi Arabia), Fadl was brought up in Abbasid Basra (now in Iraq). She was a muwallada (of mixed ancestry) raised among the Abd al-Qays tribe. Although she was legally a slave, she claimed to be a freeborn daughter of the tribe and that her brothers had sold her into slavery unjustly; however, she was sold to Muhammad ibn al-Faraj al-Rukhkhaji, a leading officer of the Caliphate, who later gave her to Caliph al-Mutawakkil (r. 847–861).

Fadl became a prominent figure in the court. According to Ibn Annadim, a bibliographer (died 1047), Fadl's diwan extended to twenty pages. Her pupils included the singer Faridah. When Fadl was brought before al-Mutawakkil the very day she had been given to him, al-Mutawakkil asked her, "Are you really a poet"? She replied: Those who buy and sell me all say so. He laughed and said "Recite some of your poetry to us" and she recited following verses:

The rightly guided Ruler acceded in the year three and thirty.
A Caliphate entrusted to al-Mutawakkil, when he was seven and twenty
Let's us hope, Rightly guided Ruler that your rule goes on for eighty.
God bless you! On all who do not say Amen" — The curse of Almighty

Abu al-Ayna said that the Caliph liked the poem and gave her fifty thousand dirhams.

She was described as "dark-skinned, cultured, eloquent, and could think on her feet. Poetry came naturally to her, and she was better at it than all the other women of her time".

She died in 870/71.

== Poetry ==
An example of Fadl's work, in the translation of Abdullah al-Udhari, is:

The following poem was written in response to the poet Abu Dulaf (d. 840) who hinted in a poem that she was not a virgin and he preferred virgins, whom he compared to unpierced pearls.

Riding beasts are no joy to ride until they're bridled and mounted.
So pearls are useless unless they're pierced and threaded.
