= Great Mosque of Samarra =

9th-century former mosque in Samarra, Iraq

- جَامِع سَامَرَّاء ٱلْكَبِيْر
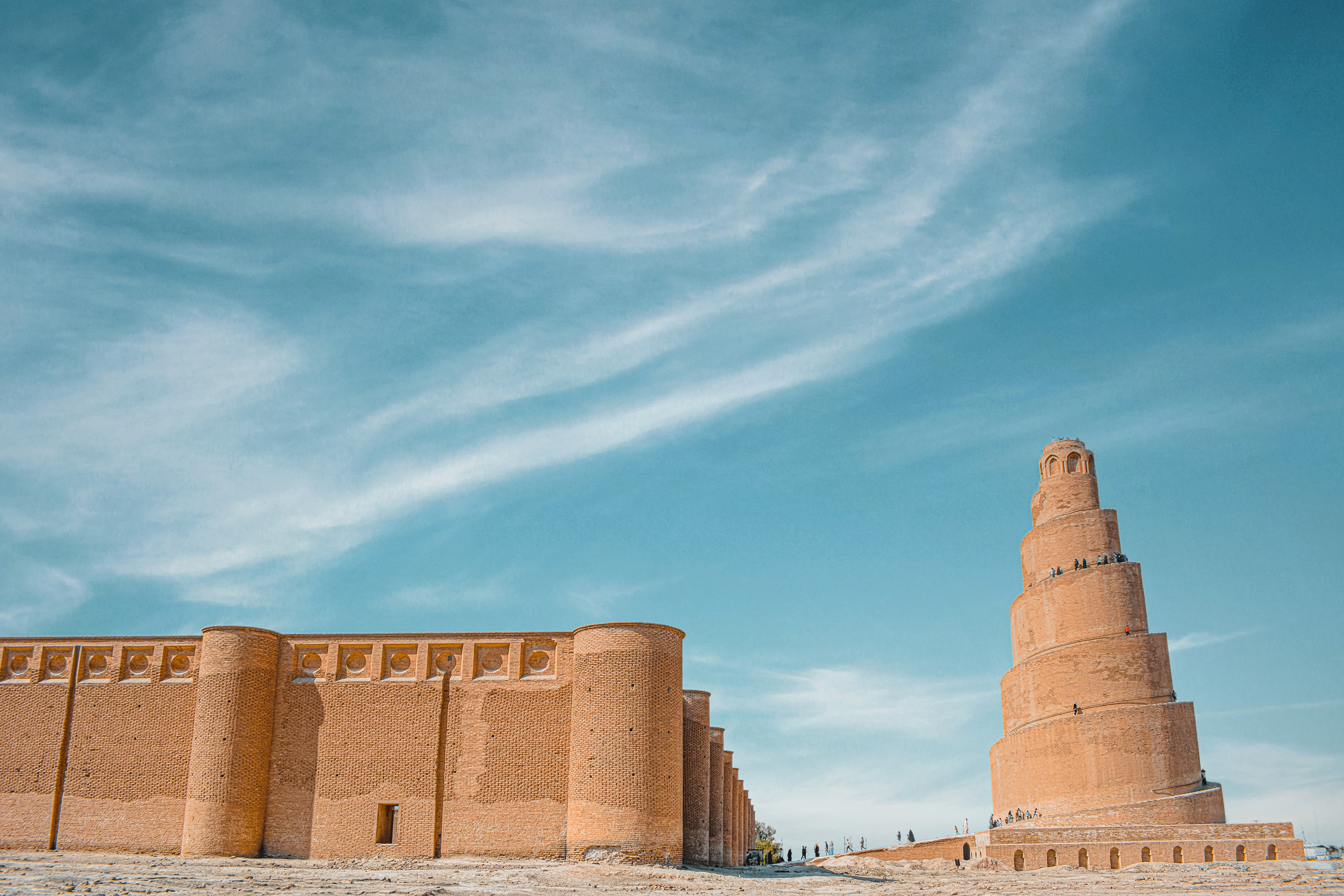
- The minaret and wall of the former mosque

- Location of the former mosque in Iraq

Religion
- Affiliation: Islam (former)
- Ecclesiastical or organisational status: Congregational mosque (851–1278 CE)
- Status: Inactive (as a mosque); Partially destroyed (1278 CE); (Outer wall and minaret preserved)

Location
- Location: Samarra, Saladin Governorate
- Country: Iraq
- Interactive map of Great Mosque of Samarra
- Coordinates: 34°12′21″N 43°52′47″E

Architecture
- Type: Islamic
- Style: Abbasid
- Founder: Al-Mutawakkil
- Groundbreaking: 234 AH (848/849 CE)
- Completed: 236 AH (850/851 CE)
- Destroyed: 656 AH (1258/1259 CE)

Specifications
- Capacity: 60,000+
- Minaret: 1
- Minaret height: 52 m (171 ft)
- Site area: Inner Mosque interior: 37,440 m^{2} (403,000 sq ft) Inner Mosque plus roofed ziyadas: 66,468 m^{2} (715,460 sq ft) Outer Enclosure: 165,886 m^{2} (1,785,580 sq ft)
- Materials: Bricks; marble; glass; sandstone

UNESCO World Heritage Site
- Official name: Samarra Archaeological City
- Criteria: Cultural: ii, iii, iv
- Reference: 276
- Inscription: 2007 (31st Session)
- Endangered: 2007-
- Area: 15,058 ha (37,210 acres)
- Buffer zone: 31,414 ha (77,630 acres)

The Great Mosque of Samarra or Al-Malwiya Mosque (Arabic: جَامِع سَامَرَّاء ٱلْكَبِيْر; Arabic: مَسْجِد سَامَرَّاء ٱلْكَبِيْر; Arabic: ٱلْمَسْجِد ٱلْجَامِع فِي سَامَرَّاء, lit. 'The Congregational Mosque in Samarra' or Arabic: جامع الملوية, romanized: Jāmi‘ Al-Malwiyya, lit. 'Mosque of the Spiral one'.) is a former congregational mosque, now in partial ruins, in Samarra, in the Saladin Governorate of Iraq. The mosque was commissioned in 848 CE and completed in 851 by the Abbasid caliph Al-Mutawakkil. At the time of construction it was the world's largest mosque. It is known for its 52-metre-high (171 ft) minaret encircled by a spiral ramp. The former mosque is within the 15,058-hectare (37,210-acre) Samarra Archaeological City UNESCO World Heritage Site, listed in 2007.

== History ==
For a time, the mosque was the largest in the world covering a total area of 165,886 m2, with capacity for more than 60,000 worshippers; its minaret, the Malwiya Tower, is a spiralling cone 52 metres (171 ft) high and 33 metres (108 ft) wide with a spiral ramp.

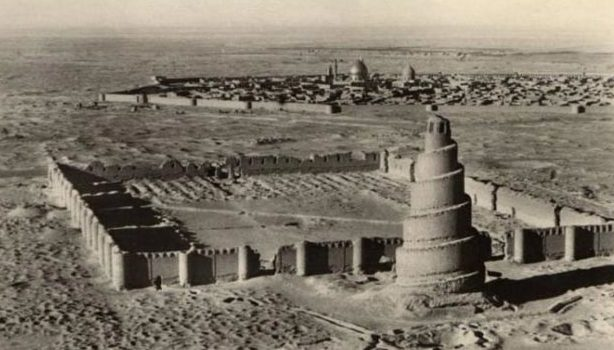
Full aerial view of the mosque, with Al-Askari Shrine in the background

The reign of Al-Mutawakkil (r. 847–861) had a great effect on the appearance of the city, for he seemed to have been a lover of architecture, and the one responsible for building the Great Mosque of Samarra. Al-Mutawakkil and his hired workers as well as other people from the area constructed this mosque using baked brick octagon piers that included four marble columns in the corners. The marble columns were imported, which draws on the fact that Al-Mutawakkil hired artists and architects from all over the Abbasid empire to help him construct the Great Mosque. In a list of his building projects which appears in several different versions, the new congregational mosque and up to twenty palaces are mentioned, totalling between 258 and 294 million dirhams. The new congregational mosque, with its spiral minaret, built between 234 AH (848/849 CE) and 236 AH (850/851 CE), formed part of an extension of the city to the east, extending into the old hunting park.

The mosque had 17 aisles, and its walls were paneled with mosaics of dark blue glass. It was part of an extension of Samarra eastwards. The art and architecture of the mosque were influential; stucco carvings within the mosque in floral and geometric designs represent early Islamic decoration. The Mosque of Ibn Tulun in Cairo, Egypt, was based on the Samarra Mosque in many regards and similarly stands in a large open space.

At the time of construction, another major feature of Samarra was the inlets of the great Nahrawan canal. This provided flood plains for a rich agricultural centre. Small and medium-sized game were also hunted in the area. This encompassed the main area of the city that held Islamic structures like the main palace and subsidiary palaces of the Waziri and the Umari as well as a large number of houses in a residential area. The Great Mosque was built right outside this main area and became a staple for the people of Samarra as well as visitors and foreigners. This project, along with others by Al-Mutawakkil, transformed the city of Samarra from a medium-sized centre into the enormous city seen today.

Al-Mutawakkil, the caliph who commissioned it, was assassinated in 861, and structures like this mosque were then difficult to credit to a subsequent caliph. There was unrest and a ten-year period of trouble, including a civil war in 865–866. This Great Mosque was one of the last buildings with a known name attributed to it in this period.

The mosque was destroyed in 656 AH (1258/1259 CE), after Hulagu Khan's invasion of Iraq.

=== Modern conservation ===
Only the mosque's outer wall and its minaret have been preserved. The Iraqi State Organization of Antiquities have been working closely with historians and architects in a restoration process starting in 1956. They tasked people to restore various monuments in Samarra including the Great Mosque. There was extensive restoration done to both the courtyard of the mosque as well as the spiral minaret. Previously, only 6 steps remained in the minaret and very few complete arches surrounded the courtyard.

The minaret sustained further damage in 2005, when its top was destroyed by an explosion. According to some sources, Iraqi insurgents were responsible for the attack, following the tower's use as a sniper position by US forces. In 2015, UNESCO and the Iraqi government announced a project to restore the minaret and assess damages to the rest of the Samarra archeological site, which was made a World Heritage Site in 2007.

== Architecture ==
=== Layout ===
The mosque's main structure is encompassed by a baked brick wall on the outer edge including forty-four semi-circular towers supporting the structure. The outer wall includes twenty-eight windows. Twenty-four of them are facing the southeastern side, the qiblah. There is one window for each aisle, excluding the mihrab site. The building has a total of sixteen doors that provide access. The interior of the mosque presents a large courtyard surrounded by covered aisles on all sides. The prayer hall featured a large mihrab framed as an arch. There was a fountain in the center of the courtyard that was covered and decorated in marble tile and mosaics. This fountain was believed to be carved from one large stone (called a kasat al-fir'awn or, the Pharaoh's Cup) and carried to this area by elephants. It was constructed by caliph al-Wathiq. The traditional mosque courtyard was square, however, the Great Mosque of Samarra portrayed a rectangular courtyard surrounded by these two layers of walls. It is known by historians and architects for the walls of the mosque to be covered in glazed or glass panels. These would be in the traditional blues, whites, and golds used in many other mosques. Fragments of these panels have been found by archaeologists working on the mosques. The interior of the mosque has ceilings with a height of 11 meters with a total of 464 pillars supporting this baked brick ceiling. For the most part the interior is plain and the focus was a strong foundation set by a continuous brick slab holding together these pillars.

=== Minaret ===
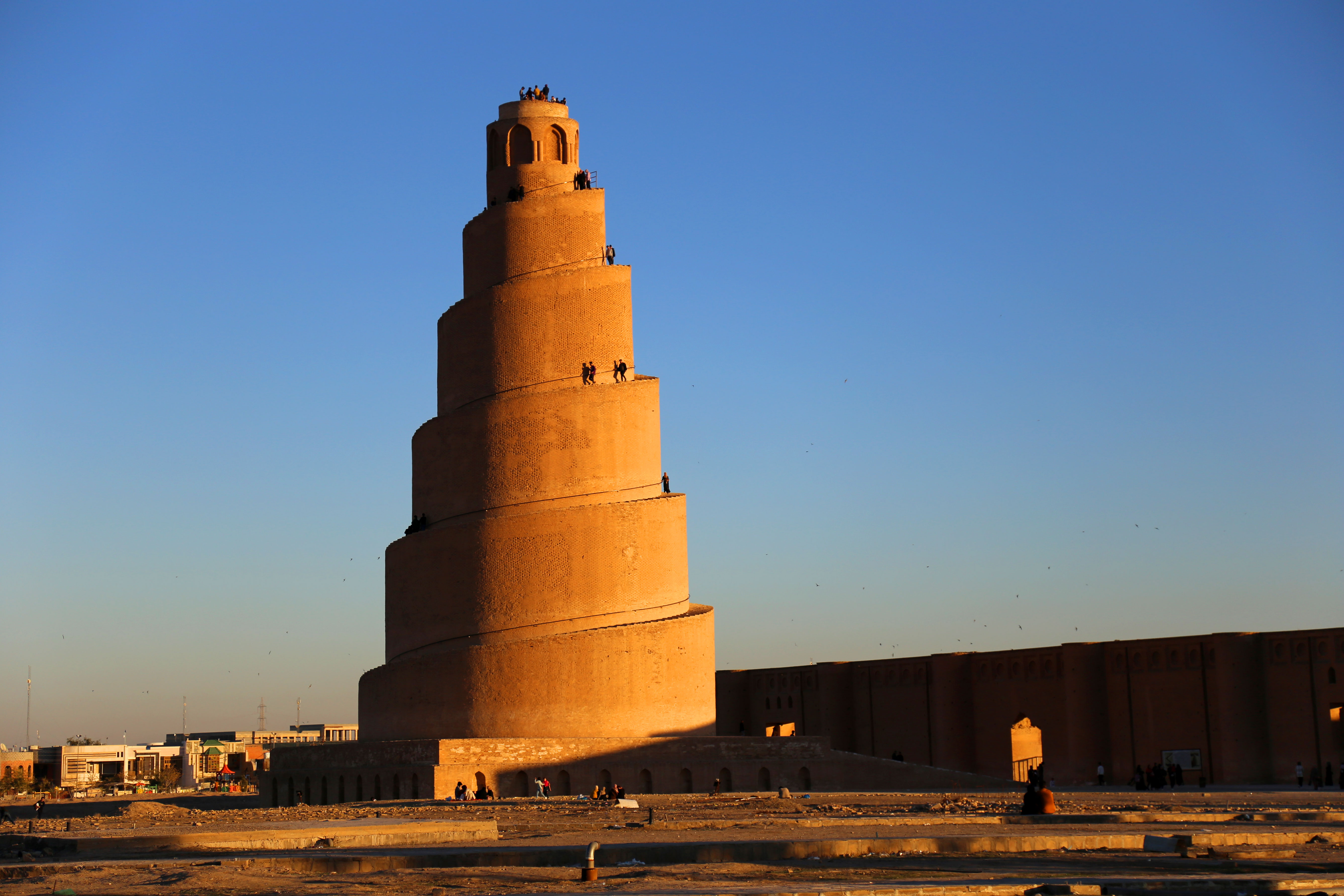
The Malawiyya minaret, standing on the north side of the mosque

The Malwiya Tower (Arabic: ٱلْمِنَارَة ٱلْمَلْوِيَّة, romanized: Al-Minārat al-Malwiyyah, lit. 'The Twisted Minaret', or 'The Snail Shell Minaret') was originally connected to the mosque by a bridge. The minaret or tower was constructed in 848–852 of sandstone, and is unique among other minarets because of its ascending spiral conical design. 52 metres (171 ft) high and 33 metres (108 ft) wide at the base, the spiral contains stairs reaching to the top.

The height of the Malwiyyah made it practical to be used for the adhan (call to prayer). It is visible from a considerable distance in the area around Samarra and therefore may have been designed as a strong visual statement of the presence of Islam in the Tigris Valley.

The minaret's unique spiral design is said by some to be derived from the architecture of the Mesopotamian ziggurats. This design, completed under al-Mutawakkil, was unlike other minarets created in this time or anything else seen in the Islamic world because of its base's shape. The Mesopotamian Ziggurats had a square base while this minaret and others built like it in Iraq have a circular base with a twisted spiral leading up to the top. Some consider the influence of the Pillar of Gor, which was also square not circular, built in the Sasanian Empire, more prominent. This style of spiraling minaret was then repeated by the caliph Abu Dulaf for his mosque (also in Samarra), and later reappeared in the minaret of the Mosque of Ibn Tulun in Cairo, Egypt. These minarets become a focal point of the skyline in any city and are a call to attention and prayer. These earlier theories which proposed that these helicoidal minarets were inspired by ancient Mesopotamian ziggurats has been challenged and rejected by some modern scholars including Richard Ettinghausen, Oleg Grabar, and Jonathan Bloom.

The minaret's spiral shape inspired Pritzker Architecture Prize winner Philip Johnson's design for the 1976 Chapel of Thanksgiving at Thanks-Giving Square in Dallas, Texas, in the United States. The minarets of a prominent Emirati mosque, that of Sheikh Khalifa in Al Ain, have been also been inspired by this minaret. The influence of the minaret and courtyard of the mosque is seen in these places, as well as in modern mosques.

== Gallery ==
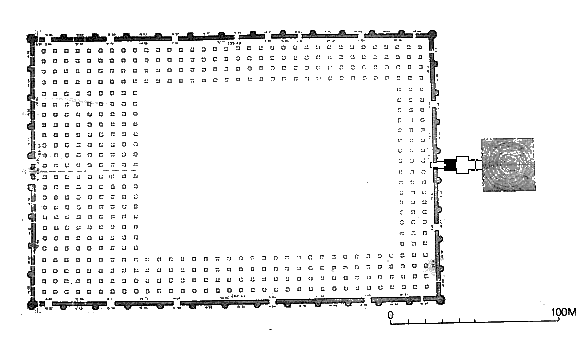
Building plan of the mosque

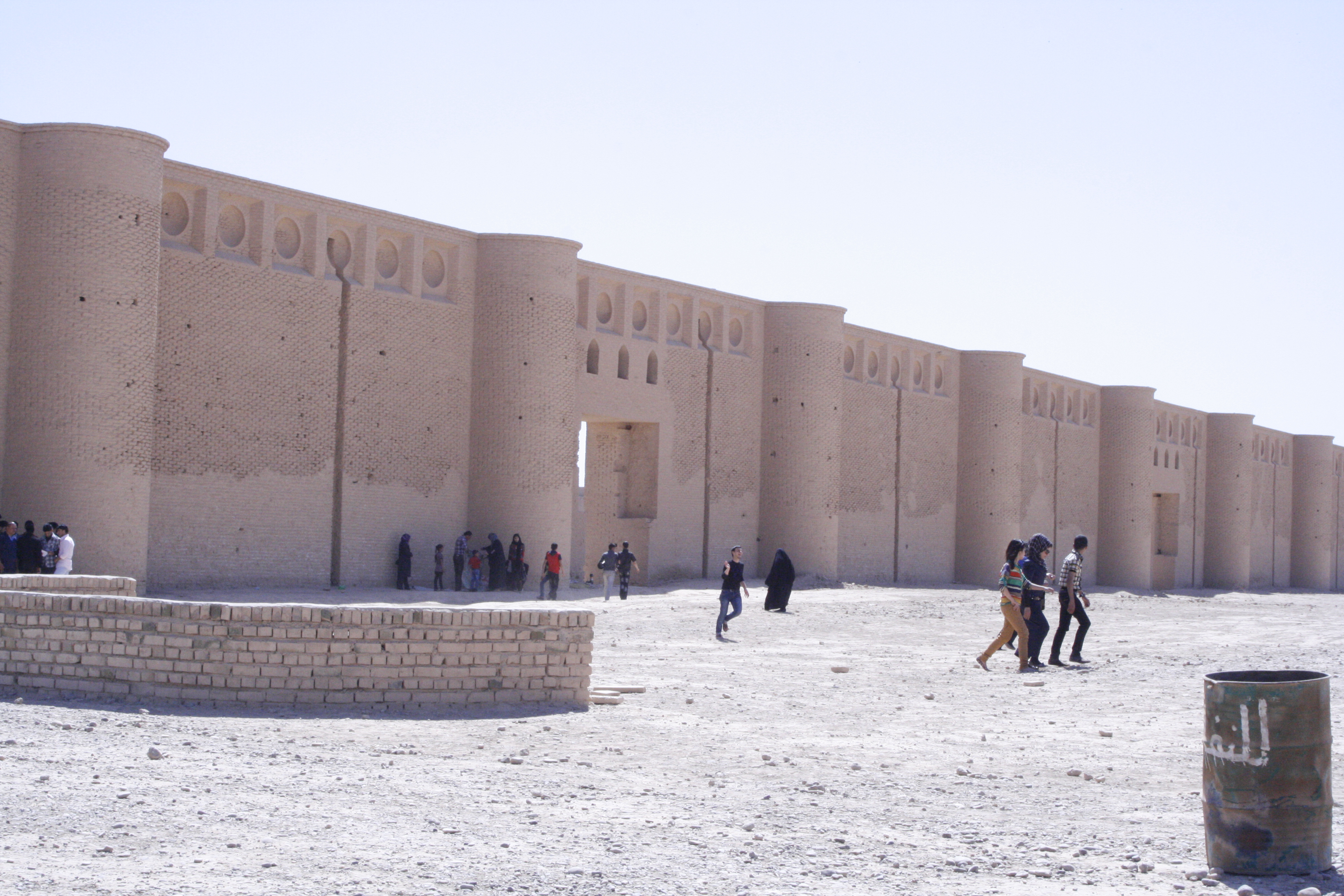
Side view of a wall

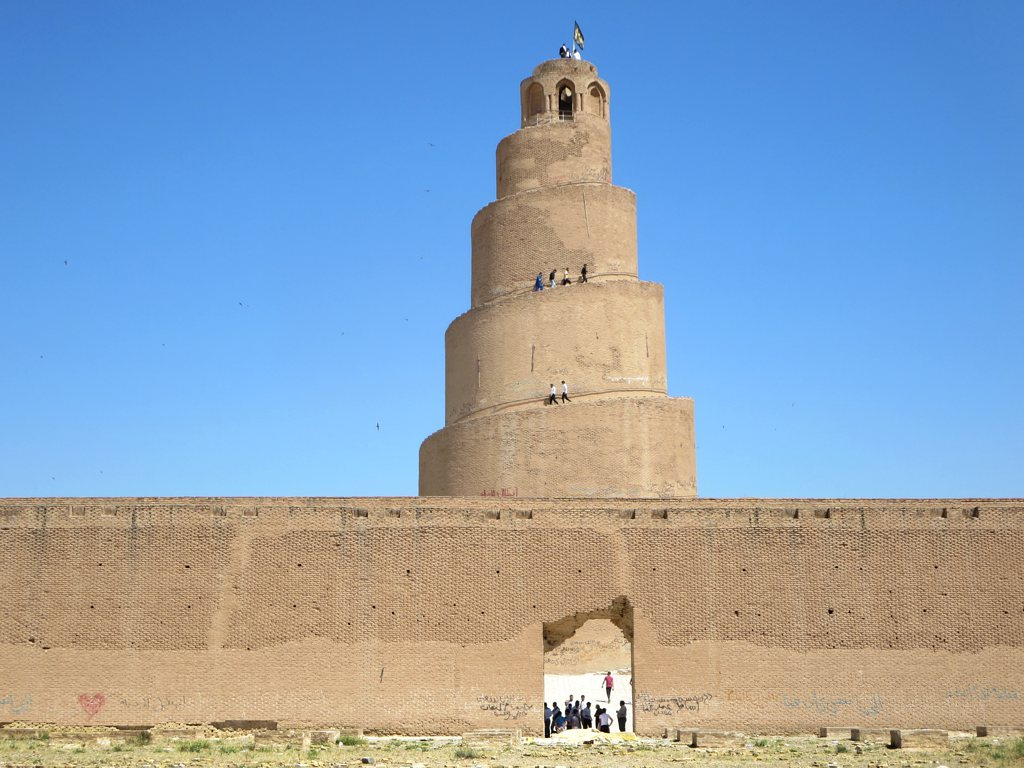
Minaret and mosque wall

== See also ==
- Islam in Iraq
- List of mosques in Iraq
- Chogha Zanbil
- Firuzabad, Fars
- List of tallest structures built before the 20th century
- The Wonderful Barn
