= Farida (singer) =

9th-century Arabic singer of Abbasid era

Faridah al-Saghir فريدة الصغير
- Born: c. 830; Abbasid Caliphate
- Died: 860s/70s Samarra, Abbasid Caliphate
- Resting place: Samarra
- Occupation: Qiyan
- Spouse: al-Mutawakkil (m. 847)
- Writing career
- Language: Arabic
- Period: Abbasid Era

Faridah al-Saghir (Arabic: فريدة الصغير, born c. 830) also simply known as Faridah (Arabic: فريدة) was an Abbasid qayna (enslaved singing-girl), who performed in the court of Abbasid caliph al-Wathiq (r. 842–847) and al-Mutawakkil (r. 847–861). She was of Turkic origin.

Originally a singing-girl belonging to the musician Amr ibn Bana, Farida was presented as a gift to Al-Wathiq. She studied with Shāriyah, and achieved prominence at the courts of both Al-Wathiq and his successor Al-Mutawakkil. An admirer of Ishaq al-Mawsili, she defended his reputation when it was attacked.

Faridah was also pupil of Fadl al-Sha'irah. She was a excel lent performer. The meaning of her name Faridah was solitaire, she was mostly known as Faridah al-Saghir meaning Faridah the younger.

Al-Mutawakkil's only wife was Faridah. She belonged to the household of his brother Caliph al-Wathiq, who kept her as a concubine and favorite although she previously belonged to the singer Amr ibn Banah. When al-Wathiq died (al-Wathiq died as the result of edema, likely from liver damage or diabetes, while being seated in an oven in an attempt to cure it, on 10 August 847), Amr presented her to al-Mutawakkil. He married her, and she became one of his favorites.

== Sources ==
- Ibn al-Sāʿī (2017). Consorts of the Caliphs: Women and the Court of Baghdad. Translated by Shawkat M. Toorawa and the Editors of the Library of Arabic Literature. Introduction by Julia Bray. Foreword by Marina Warner. New York: New York University Press. ISBN 978-1-4798-0477-1.
- Turner, John P. (2013). "The Enigmatic Reign of al-Wāthiq (r. 227/842-232/847)". In Bernards, Monique (ed.). ʿAbbāsid Studies IV. Occasional Papers of the School of ʿAbbāsid Studies, Leuven, July 5 – July 9, 2010. Gibb Memorial Trust. pp. 218–231. ISBN 978-0-906094-98-3.
- Kennedy, Hugh (2006). When Baghdad Ruled the Muslim World: The Rise and Fall of Islam's Greatest Dynasty. Cambridge, MA: Da Capo Press. ISBN 978-0-306814808.
- Kan, Kadir (2012). "Vâsiḳ-Billâh". TDV Encyclopedia of Islam, Vol. 42 (Tütün – Vehran) (in Turkish). Istanbul: Presidency of Religious Affairs, Centre for Islamic Studies. pp. 548–549. ISBN 978-975-389-737-2.
- Farmer, Henry George (1929). A history of Arabian music to the XIIIth century.
