= Qaratis =

Umm walad of Abbasid caliph al-Mutasim and mother of al-Wathiq

Umm walad of the Abbasid caliph
- Period: 812–842
- Died: 16 August 842 al-Hirah, Abbasid Caliphate
- Burial: Kufa
- Spouse: al-Mu'tasim
- Children: Harun al-Wathiq
Names
- Qaratis Umm Harun al-Wathiq
- Religion: Islam

Qaratis, also known as Umm Harun (Arabic: أم هارون) or Umm al-Wathiq (أم الواثق) was one of the umm walad of the eighth Abbasid caliph al-Mu'tasim, and mother of his successor, al-Wathiq.

== Life ==
Qaratis was a Byzantine Greek woman. She entered the caliphal harem probably in 811. She was raised in the Abbasid household before being given as a concubine to the young Abbasid prince Abu Ishaq Muhammad ibn Harun. It is unknown if she was converted to Islam before or after entering harem. Qaratis was slightly younger than Abu Ishaq Muhammad.

Qaratis gave birth to two sons, Abu Ja'far Harun (the future al-Wathiq) and Muhammad. Abu Ja'far Harun was born on 17 April 812 (various sources give slightly earlier or later dates in 811–813), on the road to Mecca.

The elder son of Qaratis was nominated heir by al-Mu'tasim. After the death of al-Mu'tasim on 5 January 842, her son ascended smoothly to the throne without any opposition by his brothers. Qaratis also became the head of the Abbasid household. Shortly after al-Wathiq's succession, Qaratis decided to go to Hajj.

Qaratis accompanied al-Wathiq's half-brother Ja'far (the future caliph al-Mutawakkil) on the Hajj in 842, but she died on the way at al-Hirah, on 16 August 842 (A.H. 227). She was buried in Kufa.

== Sources ==
- Turner, John P. (2013). "The Enigmatic Reign of al-Wāthiq (r. 227/842-232/847)". In Bernards, Monique (ed.). Abbasid Studies IV. Occasional Papers of the School of Abbasid Studies. Gibb Memorial Trust. pp. 218–231. ISBN 9780906094983.
- Kraemer, Joel L., ed. (1989). The History of al-Ṭabarī, Volume XXXIV: Incipient Decline: The Caliphates of al-Wāthiq, al-Mutawakkil and al-Muntaṣir, A.D. 841–863/A.H. 227–248. SUNY Series in Near Eastern Studies. Albany, New York: State University of New York Press. ISBN 978-0-88706-874-4.
