= Abu Dulaf Mosque =

9th-century mosque in Samarra, Iraq

- جامع أبو دلف
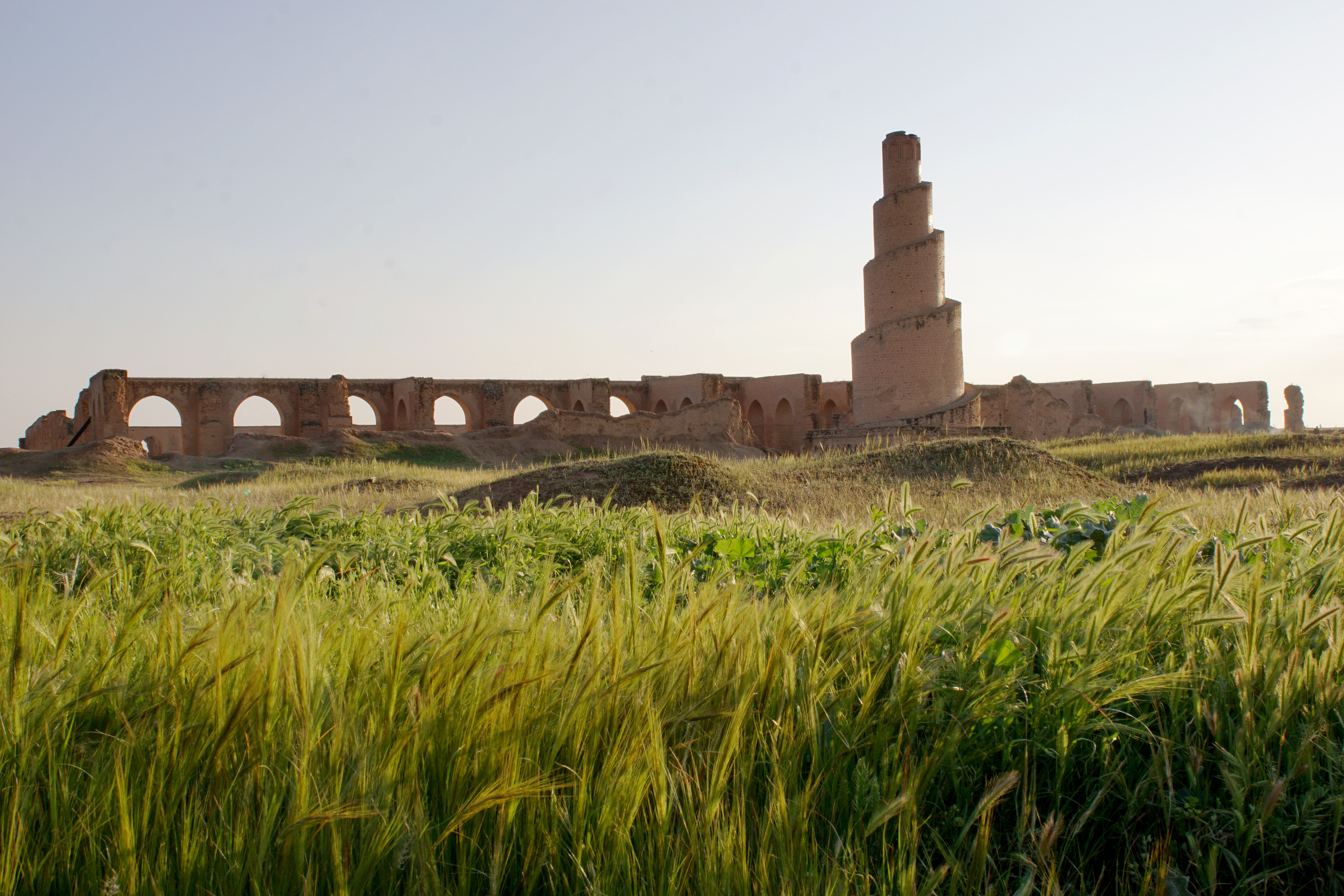
- The spiral minaret of the mosque

- Location of the mosque in Iraq

Religion
- Affiliation: Sunni Islam (former)
- Ecclesiastical or organisational status: Mosque
- Status: Inactive (as a mosque); Partially destroyed (1278 CE); (Outer wall and minaret preserved)

Location
- Location: near Samarra, Saladin Governorate
- Country: Iraq
- Coordinates: 34°21′40″N 43°48′08″E

Architecture
- Type: Islamic architecture
- Style: Abbasid
- Founder: Caliph Al-Mutawakkil
- Completed: 859 CE

Specifications
- Length: 240 m (790 ft)
- Width: 157 m (515 ft)
- Interior area: 46,800 m^{2} (504,000 sq ft)
- Minaret: One
- Minaret height: 32 m (105 ft)

UNESCO World Heritage Site
- Official name: Samarra Archaeological City
- Criteria: Cultural: ii, iii, iv
- Reference: 276
- Inscription: 2007 (31st Session)
- Endangered: 2007-
- Area: 15,058 ha (37,210 acres)
- Buffer zone: 31,414 ha (77,630 acres)

The Abu Dulaf Mosque (Arabic: جامع أبو دلف) is an ancient historic Sunni mosque, located approximately 15 kilometres (9.3 mi) north of Samarra, in the Saladin Governorate of Iraq. The mosque was commissioned by the 10th Abbasid Caliph Al-Mutawakkil in 859 CE.

The archeological mosque, along with the Great Mosque of Samarra, represent a unique example of the planning, capacity, construction, and artistic in Islamic architecture and mosques in the Abbasid Caliphate, considered one of the finest. Their large dimensions and unique spiral minarets, these mosques demonstrate the pride and political and religious strength that correspond with the strength and power of the caliphate at that time. Even after the abandonment of the mosque by the Caliphate, the mosque remained partially preserved with some damages caused mainly by ploughing and cultivation. The mosque is located within the 15,058-hectare (37,210-acre) Samarra Archaeological City UNESCO World Heritage Site, listed in 2007.

== Description ==
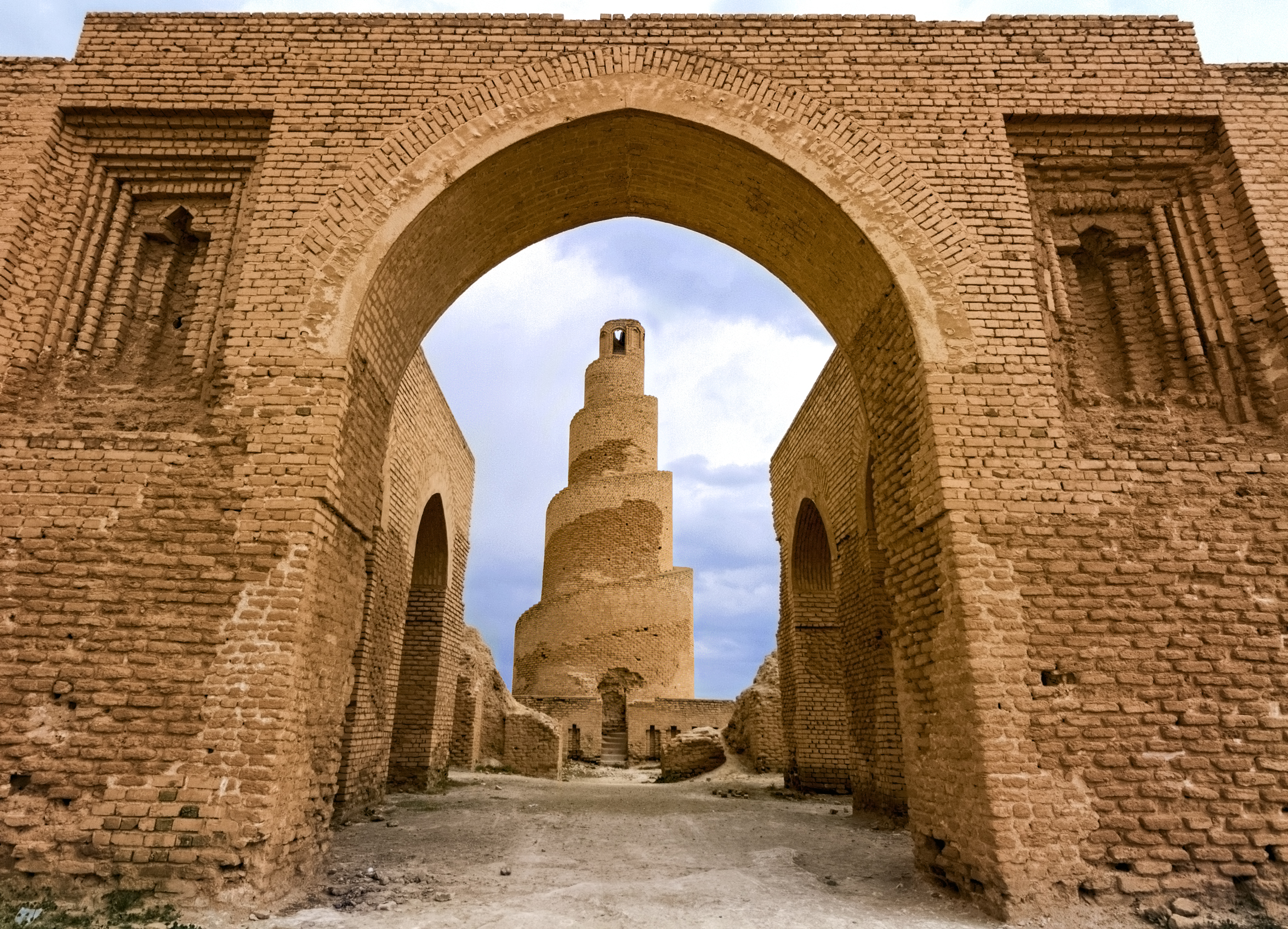
Abu Dulaf Mosque of Samarra

The mosque is rectangular shaped, and consisted of the open air sahn surrounded by the corridors with the qibla corridor being the biggest of them. The mosque is among the largest mosques in the world measured by area size 37,500 square metres (404,000 sq ft), reaching 157 metres (515 ft) wide and 240 metres (790 ft) long.

The iconic spiral minaret which resembles the renowned Malwiya of the Great Mosque of Samarra is located at the northern side. The unique design of the minaret is said to be inspired by the similar structure in Firuzabad, while others believe the minaret's unique spiral design is derived from the architecture of the Mesopotamian ziggurats (modern day Iraq). The minaret reaches 32 metres (105 ft) and standing on a square base. The mosque also has extra arcades added to its courtyard indicating that the interior of the mosque couldn't accommodate the masses during Friday prayers. The Mosque of Ibn Tulun in Cairo has similar architecture to the Abu Dulaf Mosque, as well as other mosques in Samarra at the time, if not a smaller replica of said mosque.

== See also ==
- Islam in Iraq
- List of mosques in Iraq
