= Al-Mutawakkil =

10th Abassid caliph (r.822–861 CE)

al-Mutawakkil المتوكل
- Amir al-Mu'minin; Khalifat Allah
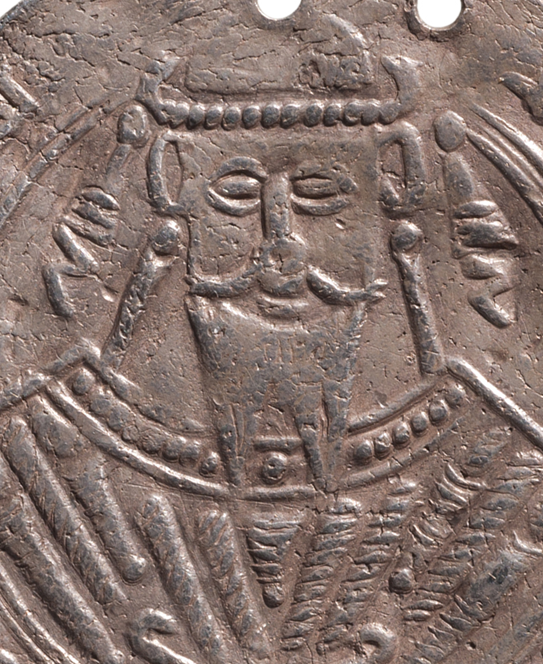
- Bust of al-Mutawakkil on a silver dirham

10th Caliph of the Abbasid Caliphate
- Reign: 10 August 847 – 10 December 861
- Predecessor: al-Wathiq
- Successor: al-Muntasir
- Born: 31 March 822; Baghdad, Abbasid Empire
- Died: 11 December 861 (aged 39); Samarra, Abbasid Empire
- Burial: Samarra
- Consort: List: Faridah; Sa'anin; Hubshiya; Umm Ishaq; Fityan; Qabiha; Lujayn; Fadl; Bunan; Mahbuba; Nashib; Mulah; Rayya; Zamya; Zajir; Najla; Shajar; Sahib
- Issue: al-Muntasir; al-Muwaffaq; al-Mu'tamid; al-Mu'tazz; al-Mu'ayyad; Isma'il; Abu'l-Hassan; Abu Isa; Ishaq; Umm Abdullah
Names
- Ja'far ibn Muḥammad al-Mutawakkil ʿalā Allāh
- Dynasty: Abbasid
- Father: al-Mu'tasim
- Mother: Umm Ja'far Shuja
- Religion: Sunni Islam

Ja'far ibn Muḥammad ibn Hārūn al-Mutawakkil ʿalā Allāh (Arabic: جعفر بن محمد بن هارون, romanized: Jaʿfar ibn Muḥammad ibn Hārūn); March 822 – 11 December 861, commonly known by his regnal name al-Mutawwakil ala Allah (Arabic: المتوكل على الله, romanized: al-Mutawakkil ʿalā Allāh, lit. 'He who relies on God'), was the tenth Abbasid caliph from 847 until his assassination in 861. He succeeded his brother, al-Wathiq (r. 842–847). He was deeply religious, and is remembered for discarding the Muʿtazila, ending the Mihna (a period of persecution of Islamic scholars), and releasing Ahmad ibn Hanbal. He is also known for his harsh rule, sometimes considered tyrannical, especially with respect to non-Muslim subjects. The Caliphate reached its maximum extent during his reign.

He was assassinated on 11 December 861 by the Turkic guard with the support of his son, al-Muntasir, marking the beginning of the period of civil strife known as the "Anarchy at Samarra".

== Early life ==
Al-Mutawakkil was born on 31 March 822 to the Abbasid prince Abu Ishaq Muhammad (the future al-Mu'tasim) and a slave concubine from Khwarazm named Shuja. His early life is obscure, as he played no role in political affairs until the death of his older half-brother, al-Wathiq, in August 847.

Al-Mutawakkil was born during his uncle al-Ma'mun's reign. His full name was Jaʽfar ibn Muhammad and his Kunya was Abu al-Fadl. The young prince's early life coincided with what is called the golden age of the Abbasid Caliphate. During his youth his father was an important official of his uncle, caliph al-Ma'mun, who ruled until his death in 833. According to the account of al-Tabari, on his deathbed al-Ma'mun dictated a letter nominating his brother, rather than al-Abbas, as his successor, and Abu Ishaq was acclaimed as caliph on 9 August, with the laqab of al-Mu'tasim (in full al-Muʿtaṣim bi’llāh, "he who seeks refuge in God"). His father became the eighth Abbasid caliph of the Caliphate in 833. His father ruled the caliphate for eight years and he was succeeded by his elder son al-Wathiq.

As a young prince, Ja'far's first and elder son Muhammad (the future al-Muntasir) was born in 837. Al-Muntasir's mother was Hubshiya, a Greek Umm walad. At the time of his birth Ja'far was 14 years old. His other sons Ahmad (the future al-Mu'tamid) and Talha (the future al-Muwaffaq) were born in 842 and 843, respectively. The future al-Mu'tamid's mother was Kufan Umm walad called Fityan.

As a prince, Ja'far lead the pilgrims in 842 (the year of al-Wathiq's accession). Al-Wathiq's mother Qaratis accompanied him, intending to make the pilgrimage, but she died in al-Hirah on 4th Dhu al-Qadah (14 August 842) and was buried in Kufah in the Abbasid palace of Dawud ibn Isa. Ja'far remained a courtier during his brother's reign.

== Caliphate ==
Al-Wathiq's death was unexpected, and although he had a young son, he had not designated a successor. Consequently, the leading officials, the vizier Muhammad ibn al-Zayyat, the chief qādī, Ahmad ibn Abi Duwad, the Turkish generals Itakh and Wasif al-Turki, and a few others, assembled to determine his successor. Ibn al-Zayyat initially proposed al-Wathiq's son Muhammad (the future al-Muhtadi), but due to his youth he was passed over, and instead, the council chose the 26-year-old Ja'far, who became the caliph al-Mutawakkil. The officials hoped that the new Caliph would prove a pliable puppet, like al-Wathiq. However, al-Mutawakkil was resolved to restore the authority of the caliphal office and restore its independence by destroying the coterie of civil and military officials, raised by his father, that effectively controlled the state.

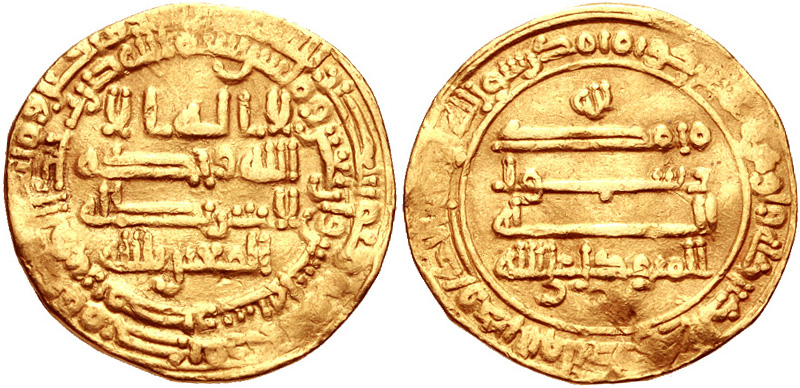
Gold Dinar of Caliph al-Mutawakkil (847 – 861)

Al-Mutawakkil's first target was the vizier, Ibn al-Zayyat, against whom he harboured a deep grudge over the way he had disrespected him in the past. According to al-Tabari, when al-Wathiq had grown angry and suspicious at his brother, al-Mutawakkil had visited the vizier in hopes of persuading him to intercede with the Caliph. Not only had Ibn al-Zayyat kept the Abbasid prince waiting until he finished going through his correspondence, but even mocked him, in the presence of others, for coming to him seeking assistance. Not only that, but when the dejected prince left, Ibn al-Zayyat wrote to the Caliph to complain about his appearance, noting that he was dressed in an effeminate fashion and that his hair was too long. As a result, al-Wathiq had his brother summoned to court. Al-Mutawakkil came in a brand-new court dress, hoping to mollify the Caliph, but instead, al-Wathiq ordered that his hair be shorn off, and al-Mutawakkil was struck in the face with it. In later times, al-Mutawakkil confessed that he had never been so distressed by anything in his life than by this public humiliation. Thus, on 22 September 847, he sent Itakh to summon Ibn al-Zayyat as if for an audience. Instead, the vizier was brought to Itakh's residence, where he was placed under house arrest. His possessions were confiscated, and he was tortured to death.

This was the apogee of Itakh's career: he combined the positions of chamberlain (ḥājib), head of the Caliph's personal guard, intendant of the palace, and head of the barīd, the public post, which doubled as the government's intelligence network. In 848, however, he was persuaded to go to the hajj, and laid down his powers, only to be arrested on his return. His possessions were confiscated—reportedly, in his house alone the Caliph's agents found one million gold dinars (equivalent to over 4 tons). He died of thirst in prison in 849.

He released from prison the famous jurist Ahmad ibn Hanbal ibn Hilal ibn Asad al-Shaybani, who opposed the Mutazilites in their opinion that the Quran was created. Ahmad ibn Hanbal, the founder of the Hanbali madhhab, was arrested and tortured throughout the reigns of father al-Mutasim, and his brother al-Wathiq.

During his reign, a man named Mahmud ibn al-Faraj al-Nayshapuri arose claiming to be a prophet. He and some followers were arrested in Baghdad. He was imprisoned, and beaten to death on 18 June 850. In the same year of 850 (236 AH), al-Mutawakkil issued a decree requiring all Christians and Jews in his realm, including Jerusalem and Caesarea, to wear a yellow (honey-colored) hood and belt to distinguish them from Muslims.

=== Suppression of Armenian Revolt ===
In 851–852 (237 AH), Armenian revolt; in 852 Al-Mutawakkil entrusted Bugha al-Kabir with responsibility of its suppression. Setting out from his base at Diyar Bakr, he first focused on the southern half of Armenia, i.e. the regions of Vaspurakan and Lake Van, before moving north to Dvin, Iberia and Albania. During these campaigns, he also defeated the renegade governor, Ishaq ibn Isma'il, and sacked and burned Tiflis. By the end of 853, Bugha had successfully subdued the region and made many Caucasian magnates and princes (the eristavi and nakharar) captive, including Grigor-Derenik Artsruni, his uncle Gurgen Artsruni and his father Ashot Artsruni, all sent to caliphal capital of Samarra. Bugha completed his campaign over the course of three years. He systematically occupied Armenia, beginning in the south with Taron and Vaspurakan, then reaching the Araxe and Kur river basins. By the time of Bugha's return to Samarra in 855, most of the princes of Arminiya, both Christian and Muslim, were captives in the Caliph's court along with their sons.

=== Improvements to Abbasid Navy and port cities of Egypt ===
In 853 the Byzantine regime tried a new approach: instead of attacking Crete (Muslim conquered Island under Abbasids) directly, they tried to sever the island's lines of supply, principally from Egypt, which was, in the words of Alexander Vasiliev, "the arsenal of the Cretan pirates". The Arab historian al-Tabari reports that three fleets, totalling almost 300 ships, were prepared and sent on simultaneous raids of Muslim naval bases in the Eastern Mediterranean. The precise targets of the first two fleets are unknown, but the third, comprising 85 ships and 5,000 men under a commander known from Arab sources only as "Ibn Qaṭūnā", headed for the Egyptian coast. The Byzantine fleet arrived at Damietta on 22 May 853. The city garrison were absent at a feast for the Day of Arafah, organized by the governor Anbasah ibn Ishaq al-Dabbi in Fustat. Damietta's inhabitants fled the undefended city, which was plundered for two days and then torched by the Byzantine troops. The Byzantines carried off some six hundred Arab and Coptic women, as well as large quantities of arms and other supplies intended for Crete. The fleet then sailed east and attacked the strong fortress of Ushtum. Upon taking it, they burned the many artillery and siege engines found there before returning home. In the immediate aftermath of the surprise attack on Damietta, according to the Arab chroniclers, the raid led to the realization of Egypt's vulnerability from the sea. After a long period of neglect, Egypt's maritime defences were urgently strengthened by governor Anbasah. Within nine months of the raid, Damietta was refortified, along with Tinnis and Alexandria. Various works were undertaken at Rosetta, Borollos, Ashmun, at-Tina, and Nastarawwa, while ships were constructed and new crews raised. Most seamen were forcibly conscripted from among the Copts and the Arabs of the interior, which earned Anbasah a bad reputation in contemporary sources, and complaints against him were directed to caliph al-Mutawakkil. Later Arabic sources like al-Maqrizi and Coptic sources confirm that the new fleet was used in raids against the Byzantines in subsequent years. Anbasah had received an order from al-Mutawakkil to build fortifications around Damietta to protect it from future attack, and construction was begun in the following year.

=== Suppression of minor revolts of Homs ===
In 854 (240 AH), the police chief in Homs killed a prominent person stirring an uprising. The uprising occurred in October–November 854, when the city inhabitants rose up and attacked the chief of security police Abu al-Mughith Musa ibn Ibrahim. According to the chronicler al-Tabari, the unrest had been provoked by Abu al-Mughith's killing of one of the City's one of the local prominent person, although the reason for this act is not known. In the resulting fighting, several of Abu al-Mughith's men were killed and he was forced to flee to Hama, while the supervisor of taxation was also expelled from the city. Upon learning what had transpired, the caliph al-Mutawakkil dispatched Attab ibn Attab al-Qaid and Muhammad ibn Abdawayh ibn Jabalah to the city. Attab was instructed by the caliph to present Ibn Abdawayh to the Homsis, offering him as a replacement to Abu al-Mughith; if they however refused the choice and continued to resist, he was to request that troops be sent against the city. In the end the inhabitants agreed to the offer, allowing Ibn Abdawayh to establish himself in Homs and assume Abu al-Mughith's former position there.

Twelve months after the first revolt, a second rebellion broke out in Homs, this time directed against Ibn Abdawayh. On this occasion some of the city's Christians became involved in the unrest, with several supporting the rebel cause. No reasons are specified by the sources for this round of violence, although grievances regarding taxation may have been a factor. The government response to the revolt was swift. Ibn Abdawayh sent a report about the incident to al-Mutawakkil, who responded by instructing him to resist the rioters. Reinforcements soon arrived from Damascus, whose garrison and governor Salih al-Abbasi had been ordered by the caliph to assist Ibn Abdawayh, as well as from the troops at Ramla in Palestine. Bolstered by this support, the governor was able to defeat the revolt, and several of its leaders were soon placed into custody.

Following this second incident of hostilities, al-Mutawakkil decided to punish the city residents by making a public example out of their leaders. Ibn Abdawayh was ordered to flog three of the local chiefs to death and crucify their bodies in front of their residences, while twenty more individuals were to each receive thirty lashes and then be sent to the Abbasid capital, Samarra. Ten notables were subsequently returned by the caliph back to Homs, where they were whipped to death and their bodies hanged upon the city gate. One rebel who was captured after the initial bout of violence had subsided was flogged until he died, and his body was suspended on a cross at a nearby fortress.

In retaliation for their involvement in the rebellion, the city's Christians were also subjected to a number of punitive measures. Al-Mutawakkil ordered the governor to expel the entire Christian population from the city, and any Christian found in Homs after three days' time was to be harshly treated. All churches and places of worship in the city were to be destroyed, while a Christian building located next to the mosque was to be annexed to the latter.

As a reward for their role in suppressing the second revolt, Ibn Abdawayh and his officers received a sizable monetary sum from the caliph, as well as gifts and robes of honor. The orders regarding Christian minority of Homs came on the heels of previous anti-dhimmi regulations issued by al-Mutawakkil in 850 and 853, which had placed various restrictions on non-Muslims throughout the empire.

=== Re-submission of Beja and Prisoner exchanges with Byzantine ===
To the south of Egypt, the Beja ceased paying the tribute that they customarily rendered to the Abbasid Egyptian authorities, (They had been paying a tax on their gold mines) and in 855 (241 AH) they began raiding the fringes of Muslim territory, causing several casualties. These activities prompted al-Mutawakkil to organize a punitive expedition, and Anbasah was instructed to provide all of his available troops for the campaign. Despite the difficult nature of the terrain, the Muslim army under Muhammad ibn Abdallah al-Qummi and Anbasah ibn Ishaq compelled the Beja to sue for peace, and their chieftain agreed to travel to Samarra and make a personal submission to the caliph.

On 23 February 856, captives were exchanged with the Byzantine Empire. It lasted 7 days. Al-Tabari reports that in total, the Byzantines held 20,000 Muslim prisoners, and that Empress-regent Theodora sent an envoy George, the son of Kyriakos, to arrange for the exchange. Caliph al-Mutawakkil in turn sent Nasr ibn al-Azhar ibn Faraj to assess the number of Muslim prisoners. A truce was arranged from 19 November 855 until 5 March 856. The Abbasid delegation was led by Shunayf al-Khadim, and he was joined by the chief qadi, Ja'far ibn Abd al-Wahid, and a number of leading Baghdadis. According to al-Tabari, the Muslims recovered 785 men and 125 women. Al-Mas'udi on the other hand gives the figure as 2,200 men or 2,000 men and 100 women.

A second exchange took place in April and May of 860, Byzantine emperor Michael III sent an elderly emissary named Triphylios with 77 Muslim prisoners to al-Mutawakkil, being presented before the Caliph on 31 May 859. Nasr ibn al-Azhar ibn Faraj was sent to accompany the Byzantine envoy back to Constantinople, but the exchange was delayed until the next spring, after the Byzantine garrison of the border fortress Loulon rebelled and went over to the Abbasids. According to al-Tabari and al-Mas'udi, 2,367 Muslim prisoners, both men and women, were exchanged in 7 days.

In 860, al-Mutawakkil's mother Umm Jaʽfar Shuja died on 19 June 861 in al-Ja'fariyyah. Her grandson, al-Muntasir, offered the funeral prayer and she was buried in the Friday Mosque. Al-Mutawakkil continued his progressive policies upto end of his reign.

Al-Mutawakkil's reign is remembered for its many reforms and is viewed as a golden age of the Abbasids. He would be the last great Abbasid caliph; after his death, the dynasty would fall into decline.

== Religious policy ==
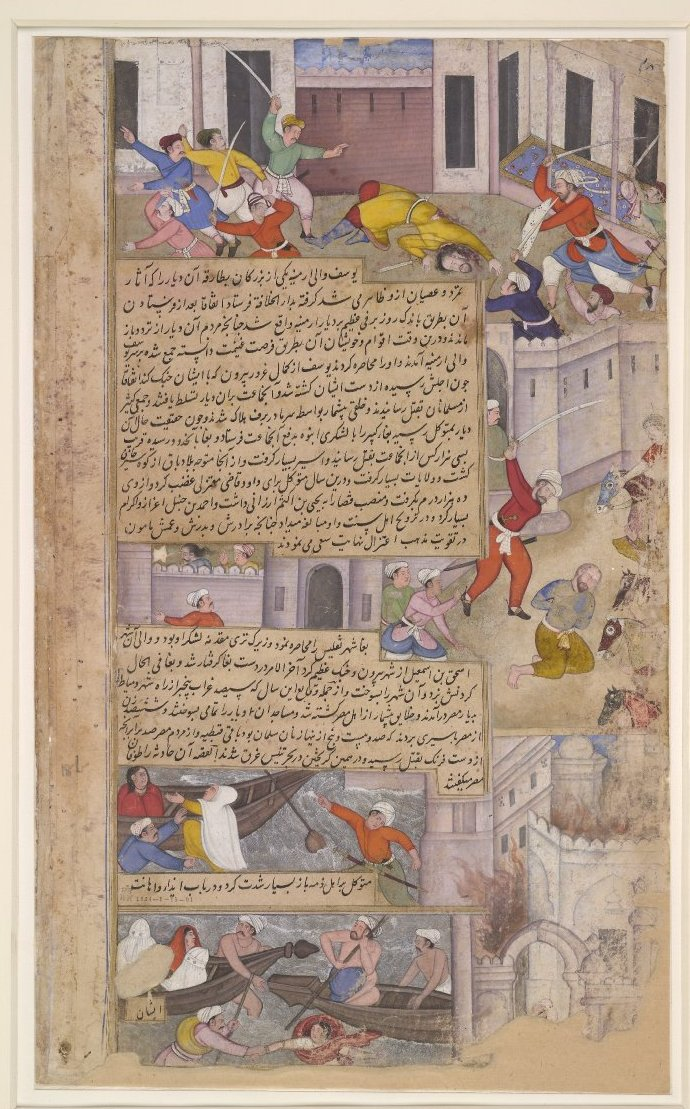
Destruction of the Grave structure in Karbala

Al-Mutawakkil decided to diverge away from the religious policies of the previous caliphs, opting instead to put a stop to the controversy over whether the Qur'an was created or uncreated, ultimately bringing an end to the doctrinal regime that had been in place since 833. Al-Mutawakkil spent the next several years taking hostile steps against the Mu'tazilites, dismissing a number of Ibn Abi Du'ad's qadis from office and ordering an end to debate over the nature of the Qur'an.

The caliph also attempted to reconcile with Ahmad ibn Hanbal (died 855) and removed Ahmad ibn Nasr's body from public display, and finally, in March 852, he ordered that all prisoners held on account of the Inquisition be released, thereby largely bringing a close to the mihna period.

Al-Mutawakkil appointed the famous Arab Islamic scholar Yahya ibn Aktham as Chief judge (Qadi al-qudat) in 851, and he remained in office until al-Mutawakkil deposed him in 854. Ja'far ibn Abd al-Wahid al-Hashimi was appointed as chief judge (qadi al-qudat) by al-Mutawakkil in July 854 as a replacement for Yahya ibn Aktham.

In 850 al-Mutawakkil made a decree ordering Dhimmi (Christians and Jews) to wear the zunnar, honey-coloured outer garments and badge-like patches on their servants' clothing to distinguish them from Muslims. Further decrees ordered the destruction of all new places of worship belonging to non-Muslims, the expropriation of a tenth of their homes for Muslims, and the conversion or evacuation of older, still-functional churches and synagogues. Non-Muslims were also restricted from meaningful involvement in government or official matters.

Also in 850, Al-Mutawakkil brought an Alid named Yahya ibn Umar from one of the Caliphate's provinces in order to punish him, after he had reportedly assembled a group of supporters. Umar ibn Faraj al-Rukhkhaj al-Sijistani,the Abbasid official secretary flogged him 18 lashes and he was incarcerated in Baghdad in the Matbaq Prison before being released, Even though al-Mutawakkil had no involvement in flogging but Yahya’s treasonous reaction against al-Mutawakkil and the government following his flogging resulted in his incarceration.

Mutawakkil ordered the ancient sacred Cypress of the Zoroastrians, the Cypress of Kashmar, to be cut down in order to use it in constructing his new palace despite the enormous protests from the Zoroastrian community. The cypress, more than 1400 years old at the time, was of legendary value to the Zoroastrians, believed to have been brought from Paradise to the earth by Zoroaster. Al-Mutawakkil was killed before the cypress wood arrived for his new palace.

Al-Mutawakkil was keen to involve himself in many religious debates. His father had neutral relations with the Alids (both Alids and Abbasid belong to same clan of Banu Hashim) who taught and preached at Medina, and for the early years of his reign, al-Mutawakkil continued the policy. Alid scholar Ali al-Hadi ibn Muhammad al-Hashmi's growing notorious reputation inspired a letter from the governor of Medina, Abdallah ibn Muhammad, suggesting that a coup was being plotted, and al-Mutawakkil extended an invitation to Samarra to the Alid scholar, an offer he could not refuse. In Samarra, the scholar was kept under minor observation and spied upon. However, no excuse to take action against him ever appeared. The minority Shiʻa population faced repression. and this was embodied in the destruction of the structure built over the grave of Husayn ibn Ali, an action that was carried out ostensibly in order to stop pilgrimages to that site, which al-Mutawakkil considered as veneration of the grave and believed it an innovation in faith.

== Accomplishments ==
Al-Mutawakkil expanded Abbasid capital city Samarra. He founded the new and important section of the city called al-Mutawakkiliyya

Al-Mutawakkil was considered a great lover of architecture and builder. He built Al-Mutawakkiliyya, which was the largest building project of the al-Mutawakkil, who ordered the construction of a new city on the northern border of al-Dur in 859. This city, which was built in the vicinity of the settlement of al-Mahuza, was intended to replace Samarra as the residence of the caliphs.

Al-Mutawakkiliyya consisted of an unwalled area, through the center of which ran a north–south avenue. On the western side of the avenue was the Abu Dulaf Mosque. Like the Great Mosque of Samarra, the Abu Dulaf Mosque included a spiral minaret, measuring 34 m (112 ft) high. The avenue ultimately led to the Ja'fari palace, which served as al-Mutawakkil's new residence. It was located in the north of al-Mutawakkiliyya and separated from the rest of the city by a wall. A canal was also dug to supply water to the new city, but this project failed and the canal never functioned properly.

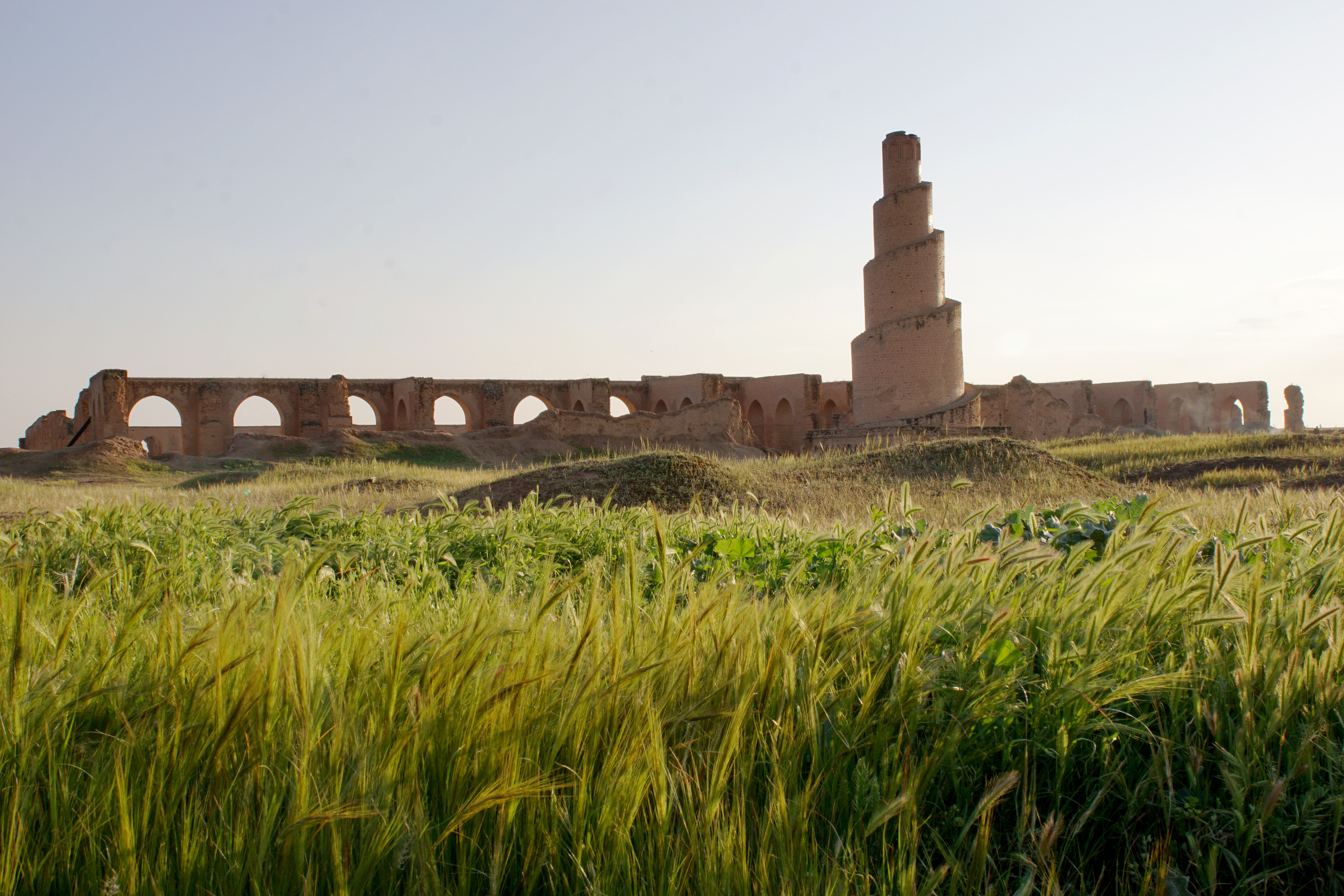
Abu Dulaf Mosque is a famous mosque commissioned by the caliph in 859. The mosque is rectangular in shape, and consists of an open-air courtyard surrounded by corridors, with the qibla corridor being the largest. The mosque is among the largest mosques in the world measured by area, reaching 46,800 square metres (504,000 sq ft).

The building al-Mutawakkiliyya marked the high point of the expansion of Samarra; al-Ya'qubi reports that there was continuous development between al-Ja'fari and Balkuwara, extending a length of seven farsakhs (42 km). Despite the significant amount of money spent to construct it, however, al-Mutawakkiliyya was occupied for only a very short time. Al-Mutawakkil took up residence in al-Ja'fari in 860 and transferred the government bureaucracies (diwans) from Samarra, but following his assassination in December 861, his son and successor al-Muntasir ordered a return to Samarra and took up residence in the Jawsaq palace instead.

Al-Musharrahat was a complex in the vicinity of Qadisiyya, to the south of Samarra. On the north side was a palace, and on the east and west sides were housing units. A large trapezoidal enclosure branched out from the complex and extended several kilometers to the north into al-Hayr. The site, which evidently served as a hunting palace, is identified with al-Shah, was built during the reign of al-Mutawakkil.

Al-Mutawakkil was also ordered the construction of The Great Mosque of Samarra. For a long time, the mosque was the largest in the world covering a total area of 165,886 m2, with capacity for more than 60,000 worshippers; Its minaret, the Malwiya Tower, is a spiralling cone 52 metres (171 ft) high and 33 metres (108 ft) wide with a spiral ramp, its minaret is a vast spiraling cone 55 m high with a spiral ramp. The mosque had 17 aisles and its walls were panelled with mosaics of dark blue glass.

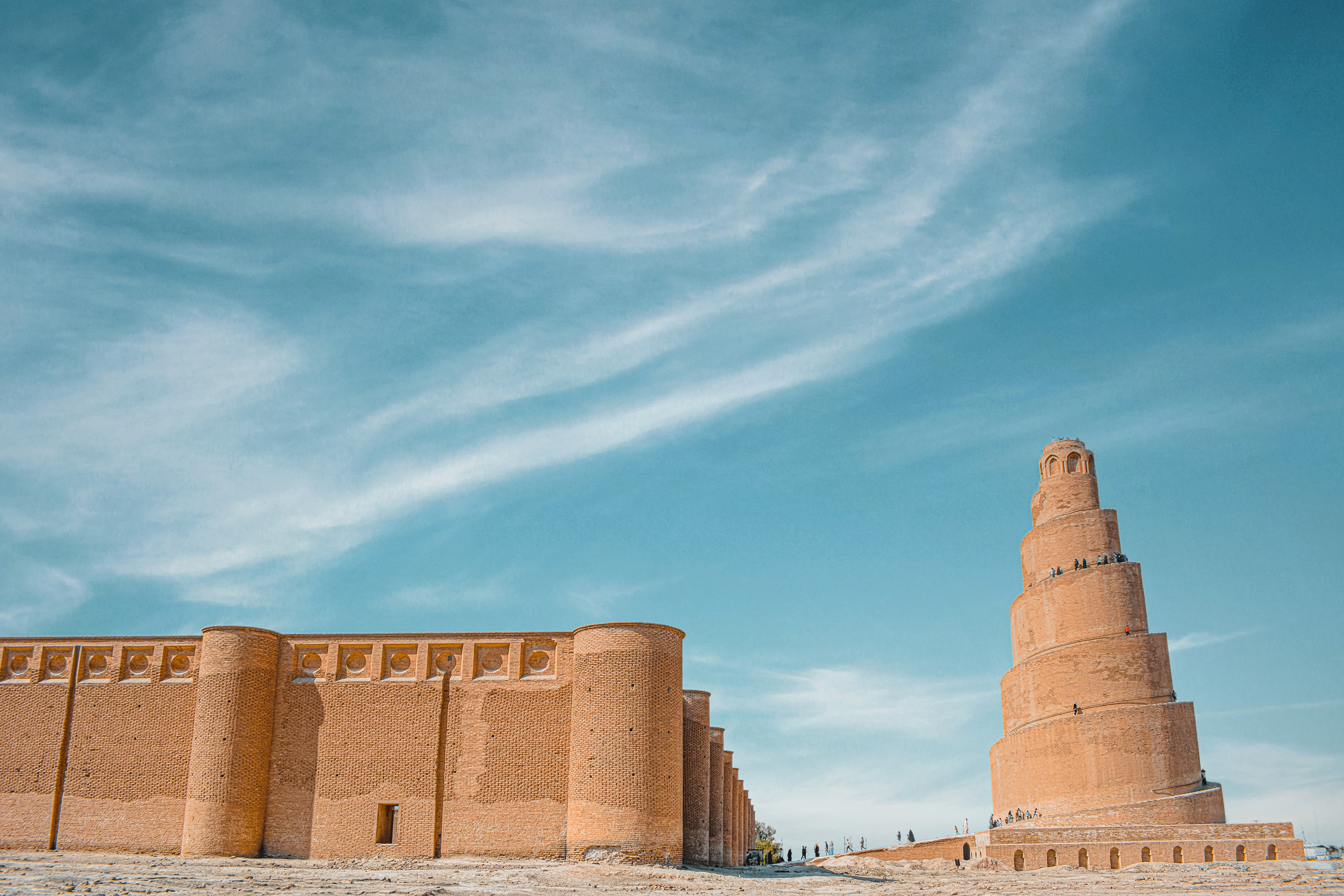
Built by al-Mutawakkil, the spiral minaret of the Great Mosque of Samarra (Iraq) was the largest mosque in the world during the 9th and 10th centuries, its spiral minaret is 52m.

The Great Mosque was just part of an extension of Samarra eastwards that was built upon part of the walled royal hunting park. Al-Mutawakkil built as many as 20 palaces (the numbers vary in documents). Samarra became one of the largest cities of the ancient world; even the archaeological site of its ruins is one of the world's most extensive.

The Caliph's building schemes extended. Al-Mutawakkil order al-Farghani the construction of the large Nilometer, called the New Nilometer, on the Rawda Island (in Old Cairo), which was completed in the year 861. This instrument allowed the height of the Nile to be measured in the event of a flood. Also in Cairo, al-Farghani was tasked with building a canal, called al-Ja‘fari, by the two brothers Muhammad and Ahmad ibn Musa, who were themselves ordered by al-Mutawakkil to oversee the construction of the canal. Reports indicate that al-Farghani made a critical mistake in the design of the canal, and had the entrance of the canal dug too deep for water to enter the rest of the canal without unusually high water levels. Al-Mutawakkil was enraged when he heard of the mistake, and so he sent Sanad ibn ‘Ali to assess the culpability of the brothers Muhammad and Ahmad who contracted al-Fraghani to build it. Sanad ibn ‘Ali ultimately reported (deceitfully) to al-Mutawakkil that there was no mistake in the design of the canal created by al-Farghani, which delayed any consequences long enough for the controversy to cease abruptly after the assassination of al-Mutawakkil in 861. Al-Farghani died in Egypt sometime after 861,before the error became public.

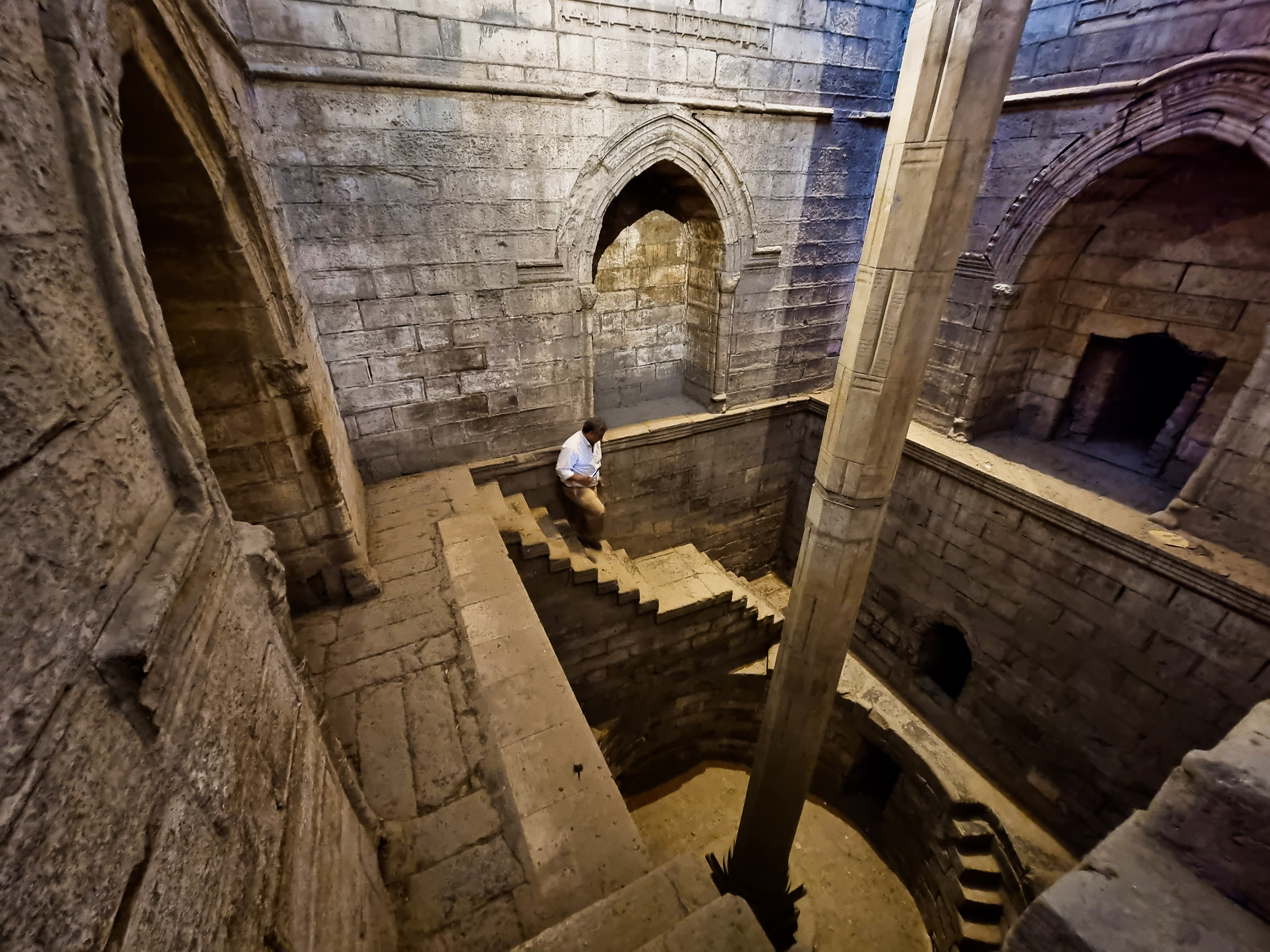
The Nilometer in Cairo, built in 861 by al-Mutawakkil

The caliph al-Mutawakkil had created a plan of succession that would allow his sons to inherit the caliphate after his death; he would be succeeded first by his eldest son, al-Muntasir, then by al-Mu'tazz and third by al-Mu'ayyad.

Also during his reign, al-Mutawakkil met the famous Byzantine theologian Cyril the Philosopher, who was sent to tighten the diplomatic relations between the Empire and the Caliphate in a state mission by the emperor Michael III.

== Family ==
One of al-Mutawakkil's wives was Farida. She belonged to the household of his brother caliph al-Wathiq, who kept her as a concubine and favorite although she belonged to the singer Amr ibn Banah. When al-Wathiq died, Amr presented her to al-Mutawakkil. He married her, and she became one of his favourites. Another wife was Sa'anin or Sha'anin. According to an anecdote from Adab al-ghuraba, a book usually attributed to Abu al-Faraj al-Isfahani, she was a Christian and the daughter of a monk at a Syrian monastery in Homs. Al-Mutawakkil encountered her at the monastery. Enchanted by her beauty and grace, he was infatuated with her. This led to poignant moments with her where he sought her companionship and it turned out that she could sing and recite poetry. Al-Mutawakkil then married her, following her conversion to Islam, and she remained his favourite until his death.

Family tree of the ninth century Abbasid caliphs. Al-Mutawakkil and his main sons are shown on the left side of the tree.

Al-Mutawakkil is reputed to have four thousand concubines, all of whom shared his bed. One of his concubines (ummahat al-walad) was Hubshiya. She was a Greek, and was the mother of his eldest son, the caliph al-Muntasir. After her son's death in 862, she commissioned a tomb for him in public view in Samarra, which made him the first Abbasid caliph whose burial place was not a secret. She died in 877. Another of his concubines was Ashar, also known by her teknonym, Umm Ishaq. She was an Andulasian and was one of his favourites. She was the mother of his sons Ibrahim al-Mu'ayyad and Abu Ahmad al-Muwaffaq. She died on 23 December 883 and was buried in al-Rusafa. Another concubine was Fityan. She was from Kufa and was the mother of caliph al-Mu'tamid. Another concubine was Qabiha. She was a Greek, and was the mother of caliph al-Mu'tazz, Isma'il and Qurb, known as Umm Abdullah. She was renowned for her poetry and her beauty, and was one of his favourites. She died in November–December 877. Another concubine was Lujayn. She commissioned a mosque in Samarra. Another concubine (hazaya) was Shajar. Al-Mutawakkil was devoted to her, preferring her over all his concubines. On one Mehregan Day, Shajar's gift of twenty gazelles with Chinese saddles, each carrying gold-latticed bags of precious scents, impressed him. Envious, his concubines plotted to kill her with a poisoned drink, leading to her demise. Another concubine (jariya) was Sahib. She possessed both beauty and impeccable manners. However, a mishap involving a servant resulted in one of her front teeth being broken, which subsequently turned black, diminishing her appeal in al-Mutawakkil's estimation. Consequently, he bestowed her to his close companion Abu Abdullah ibn Hamdun, providing her with all her belongings. Following Abu Abdullah's passing, she married an Alid, Ali ibn Yahya al-Munajjim.

Al-Mutwakkil had taken several courtesans (qiyan) as concubines. One of them was Fadl. She was a poet. She was from Basrah and was born in al-Yamama. She was from the Abd al-Qays tribe. She was purchased by Muhammad ibn al-Faraj al-Rukhkhaji, who gave her to al-Mutawakkil. She had a dark complexion, was cultured, articulate, and quick-witted. She died in 870–71. Another concubine was Mahbuba. She was born in Basrah. She was a poet and a singer. She had been given to al-Mutawakkil by Ubaydullah ibn Tahir, when he became caliph, as one of a group of four hundred slaves. She was one of his favourites. After al-Mutawakkil's death she became the property of Wasif, whom she angered, whereupon Bugha asked for her and freed her. She then went to Baghdad, where she lived in anonymity and eventually died due to sorrow. Another concubine was Mulah. She was a poet and was related to the poet Shāriyah. She was known by her epithet al-Attarah because she made a great use of perfume (attar). Another concubine was Najla. She was known for her beauty and singing. After al-Mutawakkil's death, caliph al-Musta'in married her to Utamish. Another concubine, Rayya al-Madaniyya, was a poet. She and another concubine, Zamya al-Hamadaniyya, who was also a poet, were brought from al-Yamama and sold to al-Mutawakkil. Upon seeing them, he requested they recite a poem mentioning him and his conquests. Both Rayya and Zamya complied, and Rayya's performance pleased him, leading him to keep her. When Zamya asked why he didn't choose her, he mentioned her freckles, which he saw as a flaw, but her cleverly crafted poetry changed his perception, leading him to ultimately choose her too. Another concubine was Nashib. She was famous for her exceptional singing skills and imaginative talent. Some other concubines were Bunan, a poet, and Zajir.

Al-Mutawakkil had three more sons, Abu'l-Hassan, who died in 885, Abu Isa Abdullah, who was a musician and a composer, and who was killed in 892, and Ishaq.

== Death ==
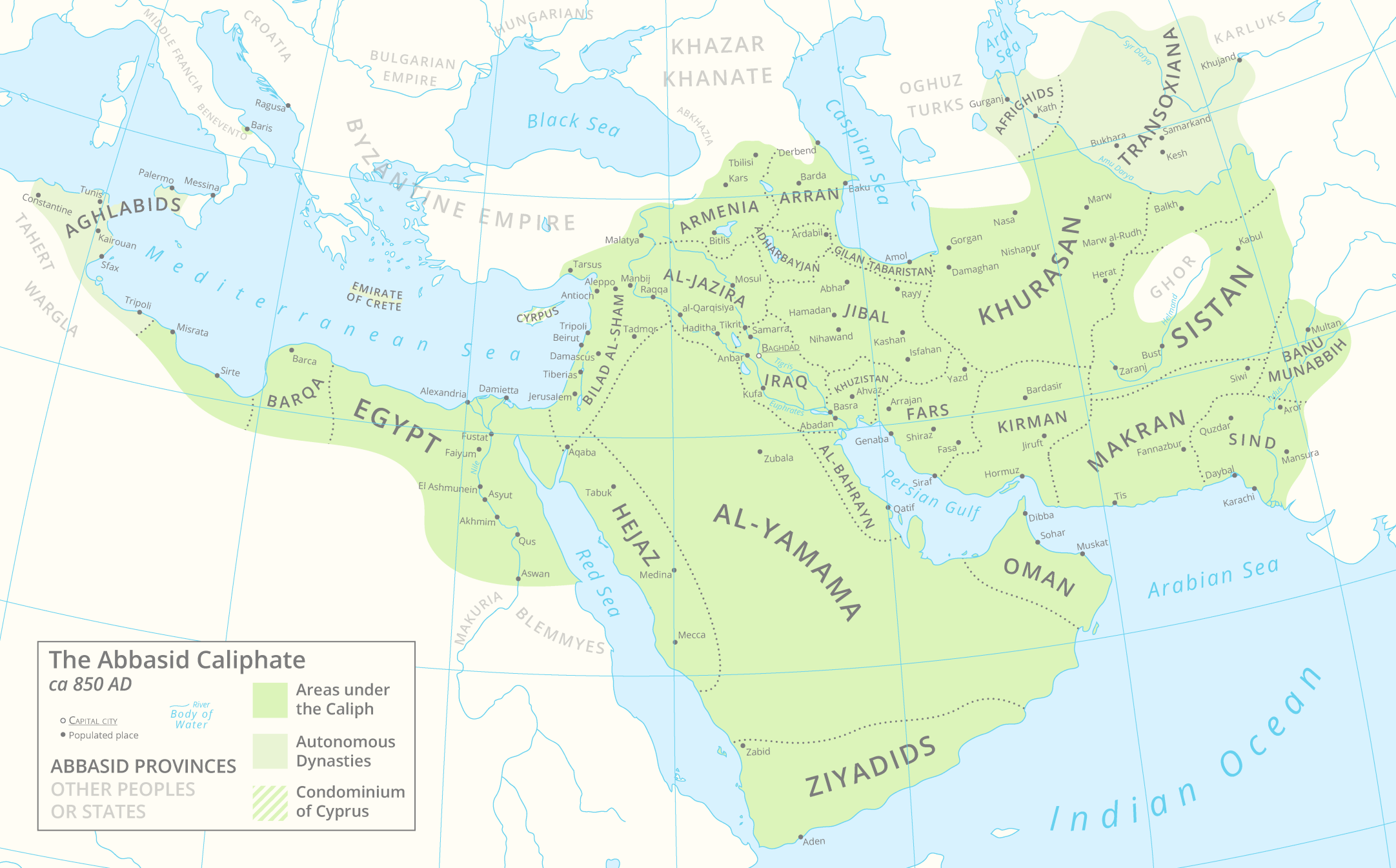
Abbasid Caliphate at its greatest extent c. 850 until al-Mutawakkil's death. (The Abbasid Caliphate completed its 100 years during his reign)

Al-Mutawakkil continued to rely on Turkic statesmen and slave soldiers to put down rebellions and lead battles against foreign empires, notably the Byzantines. His secretary, al-Fath ibn Khaqan, who was Turkic, was a famous figure of al-Mutawakkil's era. His reliance on Turkic soldiers would come back to haunt him. Al-Mutawakkil would have his Turkic commander-in-chief killed. This, coupled with his extreme attitudes towards the Shia, made his popularity decline rapidly.

Al-Mutawakkil had appointed his oldest son, al-Muntasir, as his heir in 849/50, but slowly had shifted his favor to his second son, al-Mu'tazz, encouraged by al-Fath ibn Khaqan and the vizier Ubayd Allah ibn Yahya ibn Khaqan. This rivalry extended into the political sphere, as al-Mu'tazz's succession appears to have been backed by the traditional Abbasid elites as well, while al-Muntasir was backed by the Turkic and Maghariba guard troops. In late autumn 861, matters came to a head: in October, al-Mutawakkil ordered the estates of the Turkic general Wasif to be confiscated and handed over to al-Fath. Feeling backed into a corner, the Turkic leadership began a plot to assassinate the Caliph. They were soon joined, or at least had the tacit approval, of al-Muntasir, who smarted from a succession of humiliations: on 5 December, on the recommendation of al-Fath and Ubayd Allah, he was bypassed in favor of al-Mu'tazz for leading the Friday prayer at the end of Ramadan, while three days later, when al-Mutawakkil was feeling ill and chose al-Muntasir to represent him on the prayer, once again Ubayd Allah intervened and persuaded the Caliph to go in person. Even worse, according to al-Tabari, on the next day, al-Mutawakkil alternately vilified and threatened to kill his eldest son, and even had al-Fath slap him on the face. With rumors circulating that Wasif and the other Turkish leaders would be rounded up and executed on 12 December, the conspirators decided to act.

According to al-Tabari, a story later circulated that al-Fath and Ubayd Allah were forewarned of the plot by a Turkic woman, but had disregarded it, confident that no one would dare carry it out. On the night of 10/11 December, about one hour after midnight, the Turks burst in the chamber where the Caliph and al-Fath were having supper. Al-Fath was killed trying to protect the Caliph, who was killed next. Al-Muntasir, who now assumed the caliphate, initially claimed that al-Fath had murdered his father and that he had been killed after; within a short time, however, the official story changed to al-Mutawakkil choking on his drink. The murder of al-Mutawakkil began the tumultuous period known as "Anarchy at Samarra", which lasted until 870 and brought the Abbasid Caliphate to the brink of collapse.

== Legacy ==
The Caliphate of al-Mutawakkil is remembered for its many reforms and is viewed as a golden age of the Abbasids. He would be the last great Abbasid caliph; after his death the dynasty would fall into a decline. After his death, the Caliphate built by Rashidun, Umayyad and Early Abbasids also declined as a world power.

Al-Mutawakkil was praised by many contemporary scholars. The famous scholar al-Taymi said:

There were three great caliphs: Abu Bakr, who fought the Apostates until they surrendered; Umar ibn Abd al-Aziz, who made good the abuse of Umayyads and al-Mutawakkil, who abolished heretical innovations and publicly proclaimed Sunnah

Ali ibn al-Jahm said:

The Caliph al-Mutawakkil sent for me and said, "Ali, I dreamed I saw the Prophet. I rose to greet him, and he said, 'You're rising for me even though you're a caliph?'" "It's a good dream, Commander of the Faithful," I said. "Your rising for him symbolizes your standing up for the sunnah. And he called you caliph

Ali ibn Ismail said:

In Tarsus I dreamed that I saw al-Mutawakkil sitting in a place full of light.

Al-Mutawakkil nominated his three sons as heir. Al-Muntasir was nominated first, al-Mu'tazz was nominated second heir and third was al-Mu'ayyad. Al-Muntasir became caliph on 11 December 861, after his father al-Mutawakkil was assassinated by members of his Turkic guard. Although he was suspected of being involved in the plot to kill al-Mutawakkil, he was able to quickly take control of affairs in the capital city of Samarra and receive the oath of allegiance from the leading men of the state. Al-Muntasir's sudden elevation to the Caliphate served to benefit several of his close associates, who gained senior positions in the government after his ascension. Included among these were his secretary, Ahmad ibn al-Khasib, who became vizier, and Wasif, a senior Turkic general who had likely been heavily involved in al-Mutawakkil's murder. His reign lasted less than half a year; it ended with his death from unknown causes on Sunday, 7 June 862, at the age of 24 years. During al-Muntasir's short reign (r. 861–862), the Turks pressured him into removing al-Mu'tazz and al-Mu'ayyad from the succession. When al-Muntasir died, the Turkic officers gathered together and decided to install the dead caliph's cousin al-Musta'in (Son of his brother Muhammad) on the throne. The new caliph was almost immediately faced with a large riot in Samarra in support of the disenfranchised al-Mu'tazz; the rioters were put down by the military but casualties on both sides were heavy. Al-Musta'in, worried that al-Mu'tazz or al-Mu'ayyad could press their claims to the caliphate, first attempted to buy them off and then threw them in prison. In 866 his nephew al-Musta'in was killed by his son al-Mu'tazz after Fifth Fitna. Al-Mu'tazz's reign marks the apogee of the decline of the Caliphate's central authority, and the climax of centrifugal tendencies, expressed through the emergence of the autonomous dynasties in the Abbasid Caliphate. Finally, unable to meet the financial demands of the Turkic troops, in mid-July a palace coup deposed al-Mu'tazz. He was imprisoned and maltreated to such an extent that he died after three days, on 16 July 869. He was succeeded by his cousin al-Muhtadi. He ruled until 870 until he was murdered on 21 June 870, and replaced by his cousin, al-Mu'tamid (r. 870–892).

=== In popular culture ===
Al-Mutawakkil was largely depicted in Qatar TV's 2017 Ramadan drama serial "The Imam" starring actor Muktasim Al-Nahar in his role.

Al-Mutawakkil is featured in the prologue of the video game Assassin's Creed Mirage, in which the caliph is serving as a puppet for the Order of the Ancients, a secret society devoted to restoring humanity to servitude. He initially protects a Precursor relic on their behalf, but when the game's protagonist Basim attempts to steal it, he fights the young thief and (in the latter's imagination) his friend Nehal, who stabs the caliph with his own dagger. His death allows the Order to gain more control in Baghdad, prompting the game's plot, which follows along with the Anarchy at Samarra.

== Sources ==
- El-Hibri, Tayeb (1999). "Al-Mutawakkil: an encore of the family tragedy". Reinterpreting Islamic Historiography: Hārūn al-Rashı̄d and the Narrative of the ʿAbbāsid Caliphate. Cambridge University Press. pp. 178–215. ISBN 0-521-65023-2.
- Gordon, Matthew S. (2001). The Breaking of a Thousand Swords: A History of the Turkish Military of Samarra (A.H. 200–275/815–889 C.E.). Albany, New York: State University of New York Press. ISBN 0-7914-4795-2.
- Ibn al-Sāʿī (2017). Consorts of the Caliphs: Women and the Court of Baghdad. Translated by Shawkat M. Toorawa and the Editors of the Library of Arabic Literature. Introduction by Julia Bray, Foreword by Marina Warner. New York: New York University Press. ISBN 978-1-4798-0477-1.
- Bearman, P. J.; Bianquis, Th.; Bosworth, C. E.; van Donzel, E. & Heinrichs, W. P., eds. (2004). "Aytāk̲h̲ al-Turkī". The Encyclopaedia of Islam, Second Edition. Volume XII: Supplement. Leiden: E. J. Brill. p. 106. doi:10.1163/1573-3912_islam_SIM_8373. ISBN 978-90-04-13974-9.
- Kennedy, Hugh (1993). "al-Mutawakkil ʿAlā 'llāh". In Bosworth, C. E.; van Donzel, E.; Heinrichs, W. P. & Pellat, Ch. (eds.). The Encyclopaedia of Islam, Second Edition. Volume VII: Mif–Naz. Leiden: E. J. Brill. pp. 777–778. ISBN 978-90-04-09419-2.
- Kennedy, Hugh (2004) [1986]. The Prophet and the Age of the Caliphates: The Islamic Near East from the 6th to the 11th Century (Second ed.). Harlow: Longman. ISBN 978-0-582-40525-7.
- Kennedy, Hugh (2006). When Baghdad Ruled the Muslim World: The Rise and Fall of Islam's Greatest Dynasty. Cambridge, MA: Da Capo Press. ISBN 978-0-306814808.
- Kraemer, Joel L., ed. (1989). The History of al-Ṭabarī, Volume XXXIV: Incipient Decline: The Caliphates of al-Wāthiq, al-Mutawakkil and al-Muntaṣir, A.D. 841–863/A.H. 227–248. SUNY Series in Near Eastern Studies. Albany, New York: State University of New York Press. ISBN 978-0-88706-874-4.
- Masudi (28 October 2013). Meadows Of Gold. Routledge Taylor & Francis. ISBN 978-1-136-14522-3.
- Bosworth, C.E. (1993). "al-Muntasir". In Bosworth, C. E.; van Donzel, E.; Heinrichs, W. P. & Pellat, Ch. (eds.). The Encyclopaedia of Islam, Second Edition. Volume VII: Mif–Naz. Leiden: E. J. Brill. ISBN 978-90-04-09419-2.
- Turner, John P. (2010). "The End of the Mihna". Oriens. 38: 89–106. doi:10.1163/187783710X536671.
- Melchert, Christopher (1996). "Religious Policies of the Caliphs from al-Mutawakkil to al-Muqtadir: AH 232-295/AD 847-908". Islamic Law and Society. 3 (3): 316–342. doi:10.1163/1568519962599069. JSTOR 3399413.
- Ibn Khallikan, Shams al-Din Abu al-Abbas Ahmad ibn Muhammad (1871). Ibn Khallikan's Biographical Dictionary, Vol. I. Trans. Bn. Mac Guckin de Slane. Paris: Oriental Translation Fund of Great Britain and Ireland.
- Hinds, M. (1993). "Mihna". In Bosworth, C. E.; van Donzel, E.; Heinrichs, W. P. & Pellat, Ch. (eds.). The Encyclopaedia of Islam, Second Edition. Volume VII: Mif–Naz. Leiden: E. J. Brill. pp. 2–6. ISBN 978-90-04-09419-2.
- Zetterstéen, K. V. & Pellat, Ch. (1960). "Ahmad b. Abi Du'ad". In Gibb, H. A. R.; Kramers, J. H.; Lévi-Provençal, E.; Schacht, J.; Lewis, B. & Pellat, Ch. (eds.). The Encyclopaedia of Islam, Second Edition. Volume I: A–B. Leiden: E. J. Brill. p. 271. OCLC 495469456.
- Bosworth, C. E., ed. (1987). The History of al-Ṭabarī, Volume XXXII: The Reunification of the ʿAbbāsid Caliphate: The Caliphate of al-Maʾmūn, A.D. 813–33/A.H. 198–213. SUNY Series in Near Eastern Studies. Albany, New York: State University of New York Press. ISBN 978-0-88706-058-8.
- Bosworth, C. E., ed. (1991). The History of al-Ṭabarī, Volume XXXIII: Storm and Stress Along the Northern Frontiers of the ʿAbbāsid Caliphate: The Caliphate of al-Muʿtasim, A.D. 833–842/A.H. 218–227. SUNY Series in Near Eastern Studies. Albany, New York: State University of New York Press. ISBN 978-0-7914-0493-5.
- Saliba, George, ed. (1985). The History of al-Ṭabarī, Volume XXXV: The Crisis of the ʿAbbāsid Caliphate: The Caliphates of al-Mustaʿīn and al-Muʿtazz, A.D. 862–869/A.H. 248–255. SUNY Series in Near Eastern Studies. Albany, New York: State University of New York Press. ISBN 978-0-87395-883-7.
- Yarshater, Ehsan, ed. (1985–2007). The History of al-Ṭabarī (40 vols). SUNY Series in Near Eastern Studies. Albany, New York: State University of New York Press. ISBN 978-0-7914-7249-1.
- Hovannisian, Richard G. (2004). The Armenian People From Ancient to Modern Times, Volume I: The Dynastic Periods: From Antiquity to the Fourteenth Century. Palgrave Macmillan. ISBN 1-4039-6636-2.
- Ter-Ghewondyan, Aram (1976) [1965]. The Arab Emirates in Bagratid Armenia. Translated by Garsoïan, Nina. Lisbon: Livraria Bertrand.
- Laurent, Joseph L. (1919). L'Arménie entre Byzance et l'Islam: depuis la conquête arabe jusqu'en 886 (in French). Paris: De Boccard.
- Al-Kindi, Muhammad ibn Yusuf (1912). Guest, Rhuvon (ed.). The Governors and Judges of Egypt (in Arabic). Leyden and London: E. J. Brill.
- Al-Tabari, Abu Ja'far Muhammad ibn Jarir (1985–2007). Ehsan Yar-Shater (ed.). The History of Al-Ṭabarī. Vol. 40 vols. Albany, NY: State University of New York Press.
- Al-Ya'qubi, Ahmad ibn Abu Ya'qub (1883). Houtsma, M. Th. (ed.). Historiae, Vol. 2. Leiden: E. J. Brill.
- Bury, John Bagnell (1912). A History of the Eastern Roman Empire from the Fall of Irene to the Accession of Basil I (A.D. 802–867). London: Macmillan and Company.
- Christides, Vassilios (1981). "The Raids of the Moslems of Crete in the Aegean Sea: Piracy and Conquest". Byzantion. 51: 76–111. ISSN 0378-2506.
- Kubiak, Władyslaw B. (1970). "The Byzantine Attack on Damietta in 853 and the Egyptian Navy in the 9th Century". Byzantion. 40: 45–66. ISSN 0378-2506.
- Pryor, John H.; Jeffreys, Elizabeth M. (2006). The Age of the ΔΡΟΜΩΝ: The Byzantine Navy ca. 500–1204. Leiden and Boston: Brill Academic Publishers. ISBN 978-90-04-15197-0.
- Levi della Vida, Giorgio (1944). "A papyrus reference to the Damietta raid of 853 AD". Byzantion. 17: 212–221. ISSN 0378-2506.
- Cobb, Paul M. (2001). White Banners: Contention in 'Abbasid Syria, 750-880. Albany, NY: State University of New York Press. ISBN 978-0-7914-4879-3.
- Gil, Moshe (1997) [1983]. A History of Palestine, 634–1099. Translated by Ethel Broido. Cambridge: Cambridge University Press. ISBN 0-521-59984-9.
- Gordon, Matthew S.; Robinson, Chase F.; Rowson, Everett K.; et al., eds. (2018). The Works of Ibn Wadih al-Ya'qubi: An English Translation. Vol. 3. Leiden and Boston: Brill. ISBN 978-90-04-35621-4.
- Huart, Cl. (1986). "Lamas-Ṣū". In Bosworth, C. E.; van Donzel, E.; Lewis, B. & Pellat, Ch. (eds.). The Encyclopaedia of Islam, Second Edition. Volume V: Khe–Mahi. Leiden: E. J. Brill. p. 647. ISBN 978-90-04-07819-2.
- Toynbee, Arnold (1973). Constantine Porphyrogenitus and His World. London and New York: Oxford University Press. ISBN 0-19-215253-X.
- Northedge, Alastair (2008). The Historical Topography of Samarra: Samarra Studies I. London: The British School of Archeology in Iraq. ISBN 9780903472227.
- Al-Ya'qubi, Ahmad ibn Abu Ya'qub (1892). de Goeje, M. J. (ed.). Bibliotheca Geographorum Arabicorum, Pars Septima: Kitab al-A'lak an-Nafisa VII, Auctore Abu Ali Ahmad ibn Omar Ibn Rosteh, et Kitab al-Boldan, Auctore Ahmad ibn Abi Jakub ibn Wadhih al-Katib al-Jakubi. Leiden: E. J. Brill.
- Zetterstéen, K. V. & Bosworth, C. E. (1993). "al-Muhtadī". In Bosworth, C. E.; van Donzel, E.; Heinrichs, W. P. & Pellat, Ch. (eds.). The Encyclopaedia of Islam, Second Edition. Volume VII: Mif–Naz. Leiden: E. J. Brill. pp. 476–477. ISBN 978-90-04-09419-2.
- Masudi (2010) [1989]. The Meadows of Gold: The Abbasids. Translated by Paul Lunde and Caroline Stone. London and New York: Routledge. ISBN 978-0-7103-0246-5.

Al-Mutawakkil Abbasid dynasty Born: March 822 Died: 11 December 861
Sunni Islam titles
Preceded by al-Wathiq	Caliph of the Abbasid Caliphate; 10 August 847 – 11 December 861	Succeeded by al-Muntasir
