= Shāriyah =

Singer of Abbasid period (815–870)

- شارِية
- Born: c. 815; Basra, Abbasid Caliphate
- Died: c. 870; Abbasid Caliphate
- Occupations: Singer; Composer
- Years active: 840s – 850
- Era: Islamic Golden Age (Abbasid era)
- Known for: Prominent member in the court of Abbasid Caliph Al-Wathiq (r. 842–847)

Shāriyah (Arabic: شارِية, born c. 815 in al-Basra; died c. 870 CE) was an ‘Abbasid qayna (enslaved singing-girl), who enjoyed a prominent place in the court of Al-Wathiq (r. 842–847).

== Biography ==
The main source for Shāriyah's life is the tenth century Kitāb al-Aghānī of Abū ’l-Faraj al-Iṣfahānī.

Shāriya seems to have been an illegitimate daughter of a Qurashī and was sold into slavery by a woman claiming to be her mother to the ‘Abbasid prince Ibrahīm ibn al-Mahdī, son of third Abbasid caliph, al-Mahdi (r. 775–785), and half-brother of the fifth caliph Harun al-Rashid (r. 786–809) and the poet and princess ‘Ulayya bint al-Mahdī. There was later some dispute about the sale, as Shāriyah's alleged mother tried to claim that she was freeborn, in an effort to cash in on her daughter's success; but Ibrahīm retained ownership of Shāriya until she was manumitted during the reign either of al-Muʿtaṣim (r. 833–842) or al-Wathiq. Her greatest success was at al-Wathiq's court.

== Works ==
The most important attestation of Shāriyah's poetry and skill comes in the form of an account of a musical contest between her and her older rival ‘Arīb al-Ma’mūnīya (and their respective troupes of singing-girls) in Sāmarrā’, reported in Abū ’l-Faraj al-Iṣfahānī's Kitāb al-Aghānī. It probably took place in the reign of al-Mutawakkil (r. 847–861). The description is also an important attestation of the activities of female musicians in ‘Abbasid courtly life. According to the account, "at that time, the refined and well-bred people were divided into two communities – one supported ‘Arīb (‘Arībiyya) and the other backed Shāriya (Shārawiyya). Each party favored the singer whom they admired in terms of applause, ṭarab [climactic moments], and improvisation".

The account opens:

One day we sat together at Abū ‘Isa ibn al-Mutawakkil’s, who had invited us for a morning drink. With me were also Ja‘far ibn al-Ma’mun, Sulaymān ibn Wahb and Ibrāhīm ibn al-Mudabbir, furthermore ‘Arīb and Shāriya and their singing-girls. We were all filled with joy, when Bid‘a, ‘Arīb’s slave-girl, sang:

O criticizing woman, you increase your stupid blame,
blaming me not for real fault or shame.

This song was by ‘Arīb. Then ‘Irfān sang:

And if my heart wants my beloved to separate, there are two advocates
pleading her cause deep in my heart: her braids.

This song was by Shāriya.
