= Al-Wathiq =

Abbasid caliph from 842 to 847

al-Wathiq الواثق
- Amir al-Mu'minin; Khalifat Allah
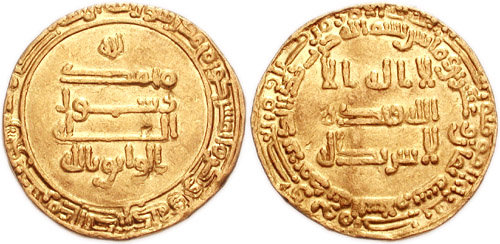
- Gold dinar of al-Wathiq, minted in Baghdad in 843

9th Caliph of the Abbasid Caliphate
- Reign: 227 - 232 AH 5 January 842 – 10 August 847 CE
- Predecessor: al-Mu'tasim
- Successor: al-Mutawakkil
- Born: 196-200 AH 18 April 812 CE; Near Mecca, Abbasid Caliphate
- Died: 232 AH 847 (aged 32-35); Samarra, Abbasid Caliphate
- Burial: Samarra
- Consorts: Qurb; Farida; Qalam
- Issue: Muhammad al-Muhtadi
Names
- Abū Jaʿfar Hārūn ibn Muhammad al-Wathiq bi'llah
- Dynasty: Abbasid
- Father: al-Mu'tasim
- Mother: Qaratis
- Religion: Mu'tazili Islam

Abū Jaʿfar Hārūn ibn Muḥammad al-Wathiq bi'Llah (Arabic: أبو جعفر هارون بن محمد, romanized: Abū Jaʿfar Hārūn ibn Muḥammad; ( 200-232 AH | 812-847 CE), commonly known by his regnal name al-Wathiq bi'Llah (Arabic: الواثق بالله, romanized: al-Wāthiq biʾllāh, lit. 'He who trusts in God'), was an Abbasid caliph who reigned from 842 until his death in 847.

Al-Wathiq is described in the sources as well-educated, intellectually curious, but also a poet, who enjoyed the company of poets and musicians as well as scholars. His brief reign was one of continuity with the policies of his father, al-Mu'tasim (r. 833–842), as power continued to rest in the hands of the same officials whom al-Mu'tasim had appointed. The chief events of the reign were the suppression of revolts: Bedouin rebellions occurred in Syria in 842, the Hejaz in 845, and the Yamama in 846, Armenia had to be pacified over several years, and above all, an abortive uprising took place in Baghdad itself in 846, under Ahmad ibn Nasr al-Khuza'i. The latter was linked to al-Wathiq's continued support for the doctrine of Mu'tazilism, and his reactivation of the mihna to root out opponents. In foreign affairs, the perennial conflict with the Byzantine Empire continued, and the Abbasids even scored a significant victory at Mauropotamos, but after a prisoner exchange in 845, warfare ceased for several years.

Al-Wathiq's character is relatively obscure compared to other early Abbasid caliphs. He appears to have been a sedentary ruler occupied with the luxuries of the court, a capable poet, and a patron of poets and musicians, as well as showing interest in scholarly pursuits. Al-Wathiq's unexpected death left the succession unsettled. Al-Wathiq's son al-Muhtadi was passed over due to his youth, and his half-brother al-Mutawakkil (r. 847–861) was chosen as the next caliph by a coterie of leading officials.

== Early life ==
Al-Wathiq was born on 18 April 812 (various sources give slightly earlier or later dates in 811–813), on the road to Mecca. His father was the Abbasid prince, and later caliph, al-Mu'tasim (r. 833–842), and his mother a Byzantine Greek slave (umm walad), Qaratis. He was named Harun after his grandfather, Caliph Harun al-Rashid (r. 786–809), and had the teknonym Abu Ja'far.

The early life of al-Wathiq is obscure, all the more since his father was initially a junior prince without prospects of succession, who owed his rise to prominence, and eventually to the caliphate, to his control of an elite private army of Turkic slave troops (ghilman). Harun ibn Ziyad is mentioned as his first teacher, and he learned calligraphy, recitation and literature from his uncle, Caliph al-Ma'mun (r. 813–833). Later sources nickname him the "Little Ma'mun" on account of his erudition and moral character.

When al-Mu'tasim became caliph, he took care for al-Wathiq, as his son and heir-apparent, to acquire experience in governance. Thus al-Wathiq was left in charge of the capital Baghdad in 835, when al-Mu'tasim moved north to found a new capital at Samarra. He is then mentioned in the account of al-Tabari as being sent to ceremonially welcome the general al-Afshin during his victorious return from the suppression of the revolt of Babak Khorramdin in 838 (in present-day Iran), and being left behind as his father's deputy during the Amorion campaign of the same year.

Al-Wathiq is then mentioned in 841 as bringing a bowl of fruit to al-Afshin, now disgraced and imprisoned. Fearing that the fruit was poisoned, al-Afshin refused to accept it, and asked for someone else to convey a message to the Caliph. In Samarra, al-Wathiq's residence was immediately adjacent to his father's palace, and he was a fixed presence at court. As historian John Turner remarks, these reports show al-Wathiq in the "role of a trusted agent of his father, which positioned him well to take over the reins of power". On the other hand, al-Wathiq was never given a military command and did not even participate in the Amorion campaign, in a departure from previous Abbasid practice.

== Reign ==
Al-Tabari records that al-Wathiq was of medium height, handsome and well-built. He was fair with a ruddy complexion, commonly associated with noble descent. His left eye was paralyzed with a white fleck, which reportedly lent his gaze a stern aspect. When al-Mu'tasim died on 5 January 842, al-Wathiq succeeded him without opposition. Inheriting a full treasury, the new caliph made generous donations to the common people, especially in Baghdad and the Islamic holy cities of Mecca and Medina. Al-Wathiq sent his mother, Qaratis, accompanied by his brother Ja'far (the future caliph al-Mutawakkil), to head the pilgrimage in 842. Qaratis died on the way at al-Hirah on 16 August 842, and was buried in Kufa.

=== Ruling elites and Government ===
Al-Wathiq's reign was short and is generally considered to have been essentially a continuation of al-Mu'tasim's own, as the government continued to be led by men that had been raised to power by al-Mu'tasim: the Turkic military commanders Itakh, Wasif, and Ashinas, the vizier, Muhammad ibn al-Zayyat, and the chief qadi (judge), Ahmad ibn Abi Duwad. These men had been personally loyal to al-Mu'tasim, but were not similarly bound to al-Wathiq; in practice, according to Turner, this narrow circle "controlled the levers of power and thus the Caliph's independence".

In a gesture likely aimed at cementing an alliance between the caliph and his most powerful commander, al-Wathiq bestowed a crown on Ashinas in June/July 843, and on the occasion invested him with sweeping authority over the western provinces, from Samarra to the Maghreb—an act which the 15th-century Egyptian scholar al-Suyuti considered as the first occasion when royal power (sultan) was delegated by a caliph to a subject. Ashinas died in 844, and Itakh succeeded him in his rank as commander-in-chief and in his over-governorship of the western provinces. The new caliph also engaged in much construction in Samarra, which went a long way towards making the caliphal residence a proper city, with markets and a port adequate to its needs. This made Samarra not only more comfortable for its inhabitants but also made investment in property there economically attractive—both major considerations for the Abbasid elites and the military, who had been forced to relocate to the new capital by al-Mu'tasim.

However, in 843/44, the Caliph—allegedly at the instigation of the vizier Ibn al-Zayyat, or, according to a story reported by al-Tabari, inspired by the downfall of the Barmakids under Harun al-Rashid—arrested, tortured, and imposed heavy fines on several of the secretaries in the central government, in an effort to raise money to pay the Turkic troops. The measure was at the same time possibly aimed at driving a wedge between civilian and military elites, or at reducing the power of the leading Turkic commanders, such as Itakh and Ashinas, since most of the secretaries arrested and forced to pay were in their service.

Al-Haruni palace was built by al-Wathiq on the Tigris. It was named after his own given name Harun, He resided there during his reign, thus Al-Haruni was the main headquarter of his government in the capital city.

=== Suppression of rebellions ===
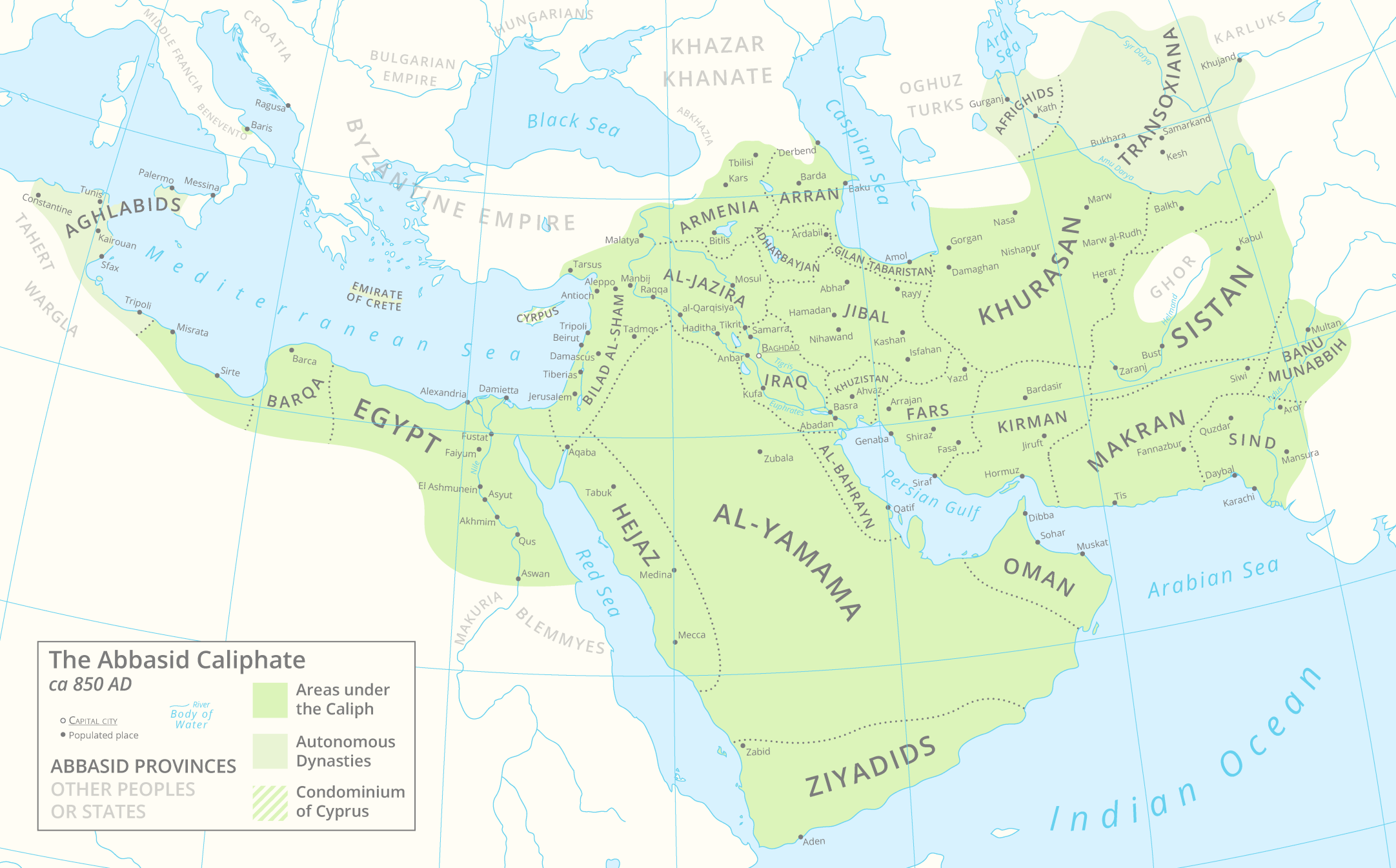
The Abbasid Caliphate and its provinces, c. 850

Already during the last months of al-Mu'tasim's life, a large-scale revolt had erupted in Palestine under a certain al-Mubarqa. Al-Mu'tasim sent the general Raja ibn Ayyub al-Hidari to confront the rebels. When al-Wathiq came to power, he dispatched al-Hidari against Ibn Bayhas, who led a Qaysi tribal revolt around Damascus. The exact relationship of this uprising with the revolt of al-Mubarqa is unclear. Taking advantage of the dissensions among the tribesmen, al-Hidari quickly defeated Ibn Bayhas, and then turned south and confronted al-Mubarqa's forces near Ramla. The battle was a decisive victory for the government army, with al-Mubarqa taken prisoner and brought to Samarra, where he was thrown into prison and never heard of again.

Upon coming to the throne, al-Wathiq appointed Khalid ibn Yazid al-Shaybani as governor of the restive province of Armenia. At the head of a large army, Khalid defeated the opposition of the local Muslim and Christian princes at the Battle of Kawakert. Khalid died soon after, but his son, Muhammad al-Shaybani, succeeded him in office and continued his father's task.

In spring 845, another tribal rebellion broke out. A local tribe, the Banu Sulaym, had become embroiled in a conflict with the tribes of Banu Kinanah and Bahilah around Medina, resulting in bloody clashes in February/March 845. The local governor, Salih ibn Ali, sent an army against them comprising regular troops as well as citizens of Medina, but, the Sulaym were victorious and proceeded to loot the environs of the two holy cities. As a result, in May al-Wathiq charged one of his Turkic generals, Bugha al-Kabir, to handle the affair. Accompanied by professional troops from the Shakiriyyah, Turkic, and Magharibah guard regiments, Bugha defeated the Sulaym and forced them to surrender. In early autumn, he also forced the Banu Hilal to submit. Bugha's troops took many prisoners, some 1,300 in total who were held in Medina. They tried to escape, but were thwarted by the Medinese, and most were killed in the process. In the meantime, Bugha used the opportunity to intimidate the other Bedouin tribes of the region, and marched to confront the Banu Fazara and the Banu Murra. The tribes fled before his advance, with many submitting, and others fleeing to al-Balqa. Bugha then subdued the Banu Kilab, taking some 1,300 of them as prisoners back to Medina in May 846.

A minor Kharijite uprising in 845/6 occurred in Diyar Rabi'a under a certain Muhammad ibn Abdallah al-Tha'labi (or Muhammad ibn Amr), but was easily suppressed by the governor of Mosul. In the same year, the general Wasif suppressed restive Kurdish tribes in Isfahan, Jibal and Fars.

In September 846, al-Wathiq sent Bugha al-Kabir to stop the depredations of the Banu Numayr in Yamamah. On 4 February 847, Bugha fought a major engagement against about 3,000 Numayris at the watering place of Batn al-Sirr. At first he was hard pressed, and his forces almost disintegrated. Then some troops he had out raiding the Numayris' horses returned, fell upon the forces attacking Bugha and completely routed them. According to one report, up to 1,500 Numayris were killed. Bugha spent a few months pacifying the region, issuing writs of safe-passage to those who submitted and pursuing the rest, before he returned to Basra in June/July 847. Over 2,200 Bedouin from various tribes were brought captive with him.

=== Religious policy ===
Map of the Mu'tazilite mihna and events associated with it

Like his father, al-Wathiq was an ardent Mu'tazilite—the sources agree that he was strongly influenced by the chief qadi, Ibn Abi Duwad—but also, like his father, maintained good relations with the Alids. In the third year of his caliphate, al-Wathiq revived the inquisition (mihna), sending officials to question jurists on their views on the controversial topic of the createdness of the Quran. Al-Wathiq supported the Mu'tazili view that the Quran was created and not eternal, and hence fell within the authority of a God-guided imam (i.e., the caliph) to interpret according to the changing circumstances. Even during a prisoner exchange held with the Byzantine Empire in 845, the ransomed Muslim prisoners were questioned on their opinions regarding the topic, with those giving unsatisfactory answers reportedly left to remain in captivity. Thus Ahmad ibn Hanbal, the founder of the Hanbali school of jurisprudence, who opposed the Mu'tazili doctrine, was forced to cease his teachings and only resumed them after al-Wathiq's death.

=== The abortive coup of al-Khuza'i and theft in public treasury (bayt al-mal) of Samarra ===
In 846, a well-respected notable, Ahmad ibn Nasr ibn Malik al-Khuza'i, a descendant of one of the original missionaries of the Abbasid Revolution, launched a plot in Baghdad to overthrow al-Wathiq, his Turkic commanders, and the Mu'tazilite doctrines. His followers distributed money to the people, and the date for the uprising was scheduled for the night of 4/5 April 846. However, according to al-Tabari, those who were supposed to sound a drum as the signal to rise got drunk and did so a day early, and there was no response. Khatib al-Baghdadi on the other hand reports simply that an informer gave the plot away to the authorities. The deputy governor of the city, Muhammad ibn Ibrahim—the governor, his brother Ishaq, was absent—inquired on the event, and the conspiracy was revealed. Al-Khuza'i and his followers were arrested and brought before al-Wathiq at Samarra.

The Caliph interrogated al-Khuza'i publicly, though more on the thorny theological issue of the createdness of the Quran , to which he answered the Qur'an is the speech of Allah, repeatedly then He asked him whether he will comes to see Allah in the day of judgement, to which he answered that is what is said, to which he retorted in anger that the creator would then be confined to a locality and contained within space, Ahmad's answers enraged al-Wathiq so much, that the Caliph took al-Samsamah, a famous sword of the pre-Islamic period, and personally joined in the execution of Ahmad, along with the Turks Bugha al-Sharabi and Sima al-Dimashqi. Ahmad's corpse was publicly displayed next to the gibbet of Babak in Baghdad, while twenty of his followers were thrown into prison.

The same year there was a break-in at the public treasury (bayt al-mal) in Samarra. Thieves made off with 42,000 silver dirhams and a small amount of gold dinars. The sahib al-shurta (chief of security), Yazid al-Huwani, a deputy of Itakh, pursued and caught them. Turner points out that this episode may provide some premonition of the crisis to erupt in later decades: security even at the main palace was lax, and, based on the thieves' loot, the treasury appears to have been almost empty at the time.

=== War with the Byzantine Empire ===
Map of Byzantine Asia Minor and the Arab–Byzantine frontier region c. 842

In 838 al-Mu'tasim had scored a major victory against the Abbasid Caliphate's perennial foe, the Byzantine Empire, with the celebrated sack of Amorion. This success was not followed up, and warfare reverted to the usual raids and counter-raids along the border. According to Byzantine sources, at the time of his death in 842, al-Mu'tasim was preparing yet another large-scale invasion, but the great fleet he had prepared to assault Constantinople perished in a storm off Cape Chelidonia a few months later. This event is not reported in Muslim sources.

Following al-Mu'tasim's death, the Byzantine regent Theoktistos attempted to reconquer the Emirate of Crete, an Abbasid vassal, but the campaign ended in disaster. In 844, an army from the border emirates of Qaliqala and Tarsus, led by Abu Sa'id, and possibly the emir of Malatya Umar al-Aqta, raided deep into Byzantine Asia Minor and reached as far as the shore of the Bosporus. The Muslims then defeated Theoktistos at the Battle of Mauropotamos, aided by the defection of senior Byzantine officers. At around the same time, the Paulicians, a sect persecuted as heretical in Byzantium, defected to the Arabs under their leader Karbeas. They founded a small principality on the Abbasid–Byzantine frontier, centred on the fortress of Tephrike, and henceforth joined the Arabs in their attacks on Byzantine territory.

In 845, a Byzantine embassy arrived at the caliphal court to negotiate about a prisoner exchange. It was held in September of the same year under the auspices of Yazaman al-Khadim, and somewhere between 3,500 and 4,600 Muslims were ransomed. In March of the same year, however, 42 officers taken captive at Amorion were executed at Samarra, after refusing to convert to Islam. After the truce arranged for the exchange expired, the Abbasid governor of Tarsus, Ahmad ibn Sa'id ibn Salm, led a winter raid with 7,000 men. It failed disastrously, with 500 men dying of cold or drowning, and 200 taken prisoner. After this, the Arab-Byzantine frontier remained quiet for six years. Only in the west did the Abbasids' Aghlabid clients continue their gradual conquest of Byzantine Sicily, capturing Messina (842/43), Modica (845), and Leontini (846). In 845/46, the Aghlabids captured Miseno near Naples in mainland Italy, and in the next year their ships appeared in the Tiber River and their crews raided the environs of Rome.

== Death and succession ==
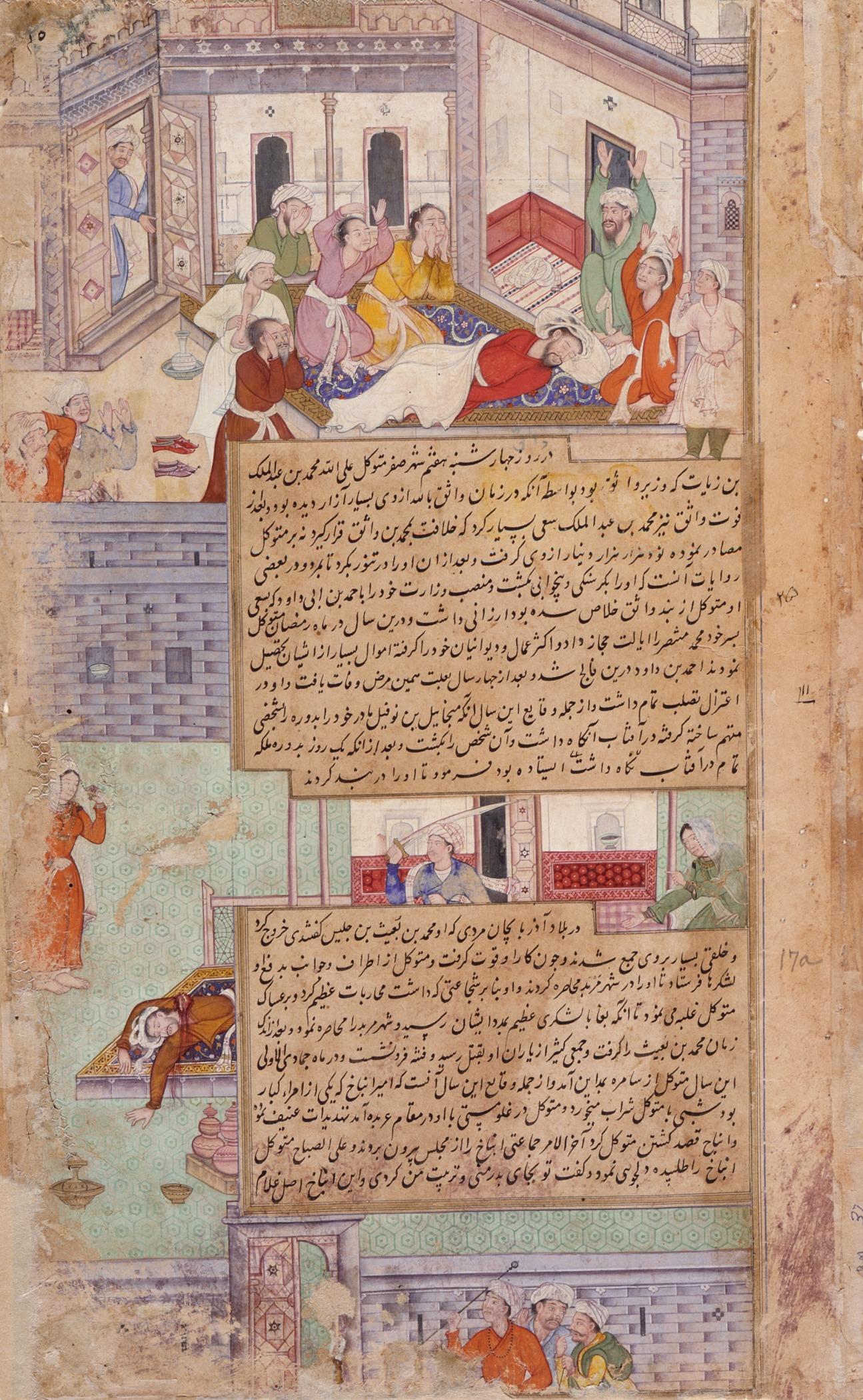
Death of Caliph al-Wathiq, Mughal miniature from the Tarikh-I Alfi (1594)

Al-Wathiq died as the result of edema, likely from liver damage or diabetes, while being seated in an oven in an attempt to cure it, on 10 August 847. His age is variously given as 32, 34, or 36 Islamic years at the time. He was buried in the Haruni Palace in Samarra, that he had built.

His death was unexpected, and left the succession open—although the near-contemporary historian al-Ya'qubi at least claims that an heir had been named, and the oath of allegiance given to him. Consequently, the leading officials, the vizier, Ibn al-Zayyat, the chief qadi, Ahmad ibn Abi Duwad, the Turkic generals Itakh and Wasif, and a few others, assembled to determine his successor. Ibn al-Zayyat initially proposed al-Wathiq's son Muhammad (the future caliph al-Muhtadi), but due to his youth he was passed over, and instead the council chose al-Wathiq's 26-year-old half-brother Ja'far, who became the caliph al-Mutawakkil.

This selection is commonly considered by historians to have been in effect a conspiracy to place a weak and pliable ruler on the throne, while the same cabal of officials would run affairs as under al-Wathiq. They would be quickly proven wrong, for al-Mutawakkil quickly moved to eliminate Ibn al-Zayyat and Itakh and consolidate his own authority.

== Assessment and legacy ==
Al-Wathiq is reported as having been generous to the poor of the holy cities of Mecca and Medina, and to have reduced taxes on maritime commerce, but he does not appear to have enjoyed any great popularity. What is told of his character shows him being a mild-mannered person, given to indolence and the pleasures of court life, to the point of becoming inebriated and falling asleep. He was an accomplished poet—more poems of his survive than of any other Abbasid caliph—as well as a skilled composer, and could play the oud well. He was also a patron of poets, singers and musicians, inviting them to the palace. He showed particular favour to the musician Ishaq al-Mawsili, the singer Mukhariq, and the poet al-Dahhak al-Bahili, known as al-Khali (lit. 'the Debauched One').

In contrast to this picture, the 10th-century historian al-Mas'udi portrays al-Wathiq as "interested in scientific learning and facilitating disputations among physicians". The Graeco-Arabic translation movement continued to flourish under his reign, and the sources also relate some episodes that show al-Wathiq's own "intellectual curiosity", especially as related to issues that could burnish his religious credentials: he reportedly dreamed that the "Barrier of Dhu'l-Qarnayn" had been breached—probably resulting from news of the movements of the Kirghiz Turks at the time that caused large population shifts among the Turkic nomads of Central Asia—and sent the chancery official Sallam al-Tarjuman to journey to the region and investigate. Likewise, according to Ibn Khordadbeh, the Caliph sent the astronomer al-Khwarizmi to the Byzantines to investigate the legend of the Seven Sleepers of Ephesus.

Al-Wathiq is one of the more obscure Abbasid caliphs. According to the historian Hugh Kennedy, "no other caliph of the period has left so little trace of the history of his times, and it is impossible to form any clear impression of his personality", while the Encyclopaedia of Islam writes that "he had not the gifts of a great ruler, and his brief reign was not distinguished by remarkable events". His very obscurity allowed William Beckford to present a heavily fictionalized version of al-Wathiq in his classic 18th-century Gothic fantasy novel Vathek, which Kennedy describes as "a fantastic tale of cruelty, dissipation and a search for the lost treasure of ancient kings, guarded by Iblis/Satan himself".

== Family ==
Family tree of the Abbasid caliphs of the ninth century. Al-Wathiq and his son are shown on the right side (middle) of the tree, the left and right corners show al-Wathiq's brothers Al-Mutawakkil, Muhammad and his main nephews.

One of al-Wathiq's concubines was Qurb, a Greek. In 833 she gave birth to al-Wathiq's son, Muhammad, the future caliph al-Muhtadi. Another concubine was Farida, who was also a musician and al-Wathiq's favourite. She was of Turkic origin. When al-Wathiq died, the singer Amr ibn Banah presented her to Caliph al-Mutawakkil. He married her, and she became one of his favourites. He had another concubine, who was a servant of Farida. Al-Wathiq was infatuated with her. Another concubine was Qalam. She belonged to Salih ibn Abd al-Wahhab, who had trained her as a singer. Al-Wathiq bought her for 5000 dinars and called her Ightibat ("delight").

Al-Wathiq also had grandchildren, one of them was Abu Bakr ibn Muhammad al-Muhtadi, who was a respected Abbasid figure and was known to lead royal and famous funeral prayers, he also led funeral of famous singer Bi'dah al-Kabirah.

Al-Wathiq's descendants remained influential upto eleventh and twelfth centuries, one of his eleventh century descendant, Abdallah ibn Uthman, pretended to be designated heir of the Caliphate and temporarily won the support of the local ruler in Transoxiana.

== Sources ==
- Bosworth, C. E., ed. (1991). The History of al-Ṭabarī, Volume XXXIII: Storm and Stress Along the Northern Frontiers of the ʿAbbāsid Caliphate: The Caliphate of al-Muʿtasim, A.D. 833–842/A.H. 218–227. SUNY Series in Near Eastern Studies. Albany, New York: State University of New York Press. ISBN 978-0-7914-0493-5.
- Eisenstein, H. (1993). "al-Mubarḳaʿ". In Bosworth, C. E.; van Donzel, E.; Heinrichs, W. P. & Pellat, Ch. (eds.). The Encyclopaedia of Islam, Second Edition. Volume VII: Mif–Naz. Leiden: E. J. Brill. p. 279. doi:10.1163/1573-3912_islam_SIM_5292. ISBN 978-90-04-09419-2.
- Gordon, Matthew S. (2001). The Breaking of a Thousand Swords: A History of the Turkish Military of Samarra (A.H. 200–275/815–889 C.E.). Albany, New York: State University of New York Press. ISBN 0-7914-4795-2.
- Ibn al-Sāʿī (2017). Consorts of the Caliphs: Women and the Court of Baghdad. Translated by Shawkat M. Toorawa and the Editors of the Library of Arabic Literature. Introduction by Julia Bray. Foreword by Marina Warner. New York: New York University Press. ISBN 978-1-4798-0477-1.
- Kan, Kadir (2012). "Vâsiḳ-Billâh". TDV Encyclopedia of Islam, Vol. 42 (Tütün – Vehran) (in Turkish). Istanbul: Presidency of Religious Affairs, Centre for Islamic Studies. pp. 548–549. ISBN 978-975-389-737-2.
- Kennedy, Hugh (2004) [1986]. The Prophet and the Age of the Caliphates: The Islamic Near East from the 6th to the 11th Century (Second ed.). Harlow: Longman. ISBN 978-0-582-40525-7.
- Kennedy, Hugh (2006). When Baghdad Ruled the Muslim World: The Rise and Fall of Islam's Greatest Dynasty. Cambridge, MA: Da Capo Press. ISBN 978-0-306814808.
- Kraemer, Joel L., ed. (1989). The History of al-Ṭabarī, Volume XXXIV: Incipient Decline: The Caliphates of al-Wāthiq, al-Mutawakkil and al-Muntaṣir, A.D. 841–863/A.H. 227–248. SUNY Series in Near Eastern Studies. Albany, New York: State University of New York Press. ISBN 978-0-88706-874-4.
- Lilie, Ralph-Johannes; Ludwig, Claudia; Pratsch, Thomas; Zielke, Beate (2013). Prosopographie der mittelbyzantinischen Zeit Online. Berlin-Brandenburgische Akademie der Wissenschaften. Nach Vorarbeiten F. Winkelmanns erstellt (in German). Berlin and Boston: De Gruyter.
- Ter-Ghewondyan, Aram (1976) [1965]. The Arab Emirates in Bagratid Armenia. Translated by Garsoïan, Nina. Lisbon: Livraria Bertrand.
- Turner, John P. (2013). "The Enigmatic Reign of al-Wāthiq (r. 227/842-232/847)". In Bernards, Monique (ed.). ʿAbbāsid Studies IV. Occasional Papers of the School of ʿAbbāsid Studies, Leuven, July 5 – July 9, 2010. Gibb Memorial Trust. pp. 218–231. ISBN 978-0-906094-98-3.
- Busse, Heribert (2004) [1969]. Chalif und Grosskönig - Die Buyiden im Irak (945-1055) [Caliph and Great King - The Buyids in Iraq (945-1055)] (in German). Würzburg: Ergon Verlag. ISBN 3-89913-005-7.
- Vasiliev, Alexander A. (1935). Byzance et les Arabes, Tome I: La dynastie d'Amorium (820–867). Corpus Bruxellense Historiae Byzantinae (in French). Vol. 1. French ed.: Henri Grégoire, Marius Canard. Brussels: Éditions de l'Institut de philologie et d'histoire orientales.
- Al-Ya'qubi, Ahmad ibn Abu Ya'qub (1892). de Goeje, M. J. (ed.). Bibliotheca Geographorum Arabicorum, Pars Septima: Kitab al-A'lak an-Nafisa VII, Auctore Abu Ali Ahmad ibn Omar Ibn Rosteh, et Kitab al-Boldan, Auctore Ahmad ibn Abi Jakub ibn Wadhih al-Katib al-Jakubi. Leiden: E. J. Brill.
- Northedge, Alastair (2008). The Historical Topography of Samarra: Samarra Studies I. London: The British School of Archeology in Iraq. ISBN 9780903472227.
- Zetterstéen, K. V.; Bosworth, C. E. & van Donzel, E. (2002). "al-Wāt̲h̲iḳ Bi 'llāh". In Bearman, P. J.; Bianquis, Th.; Bosworth, C. E.; van Donzel, E. & Heinrichs, W. P. (eds.). The Encyclopaedia of Islam, Second Edition. Volume XI: W–Z. Leiden: E. J. Brill. p. 178. doi:10.1163/1573-3912_islam_SIM_7894. ISBN 978-90-04-12756-2.

Al-Wathiq Abbasid dynasty Born: 812 Died: 847
Sunni Islam titles
Preceded by Al-Mu'tasim	Caliph of the Abbasid Caliphate; 5 January 842 – 10 August 847	Succeeded by Al-Mutawakkil
