= Great Qadi =

Religious and secular position in Islam

Great Qadi (Qadi al-Qudat) is a religious and secular position established during Abbasid Caliphate, specifically under the caliphate of Harun al-Rashid. The position emerged from the necessity to establish a clear separation between the Judiciary and executive authorities, particularly following the flourishing of the Islamic state, the diversification of its institutions, and the expansion of its territories. This expansion rendered it imperative that each individual in the state have an administrative position that was distinct from those held by others, to ensure the effective fulfillment of their duties.

Great Qadi in Islamic history was appointed by the Abbasid Caliph Harun al-Rashid, who bestowed the position upon Imam Abu Yusuf. Abu Yusuf is regarded as the inaugural figure to establish the judiciary with a degree of autonomy from the executive authority. He established the distinctive attire for judges, delineated the responsibilities of great qadi in Baghdad, and reinforced the judicial principles espoused by his mentor, Imam Abu Hanifa al-Nu'man.

At the outset, the position of great qadi was held by a single individual in Baghdad. However, with the ascendance of the Fatimid Caliphate in Egypt, a second great qadi was appointed in Cairo, adhering to the Ismaili Shia doctrine. During Mamluk Sultanate, a great qadi was designated for each of the four schools of madhhab.

The appointment of a great qadi was marked by a formal ceremony where the caliph's decree was read aloud, after which the Great Qadi would exercise their judicial authority. The authority of the Great Qadi was frequently extended to encompass a range of non-judicial responsibilities, including the leadership of the Hajj, the delivery of sermons, the supervision of mosques, the provision of religious instruction, the management of the treasury (Bayt al-mal), the guidance of religious scholars, and the oversight of city walls, among numerous other duties. This illustrates the considerable status of the Great Qadi in cities such as Baghdad, Cairo, Damascus, and Córdoba (where the position was designated as Qadi al-Jama'ah).

== Judiciary before the creation of the position of Great Qadi ==
Before the advent of Islam, the tribal sheikh fulfilled the role of judge among the Arabs, basing their decisions on the customs and traditions prevailing within the tribes. These individuals did not possess legislative authority to enact laws. One of the most renowned judges of the period was Aktham ibn Saifi al-Tamimi, known as the "Judge of the Arabs". With the unification of the Arab tribes under the banner of Islam, the Quran became the primary source of law, thereby establishing the Prophet Muhammad as the first judge of Islam. The Prophet authorized certain companions to act as judges, delegating them to different regions. For example, 'Attab ibn Asid was sent to Mecca on the day of its conquest, while Muadh ibn Jabal and Ali ibn Abi Talib were sent to Yemen. However, these individuals were not formally designated as judges.

This practice continued during the caliphate of Abu Bakr al-Siddiq, who retained responsibility for the administration of justice, although Umar ibn al-Khattab was entrusted with the management of judicial affairs. Nevertheless, the office of the judge did not emerge as a distinct entity until the caliphate of Umar ibn al-Khattab, who initiated the formalization of the judiciary following the expansion of the Islamic state. He was the first to appoint judges in Islam, establishing the judiciary as an official function and conferring the title of "judge" upon the individuals responsible for its administration.

Umar appointed Abu al-Darda to the judiciary in Medina and subsequently in Damascus, Salman ibn Rabi'a in Al-Qādisiyyah and subsequently in Al-Mada'in, Abu Umayyah Shurayh ibn al-Harith in Kufa, Abu Musa al-Ash'ari in Basra, and Ka'b ibn Yasar ibn Danna, followed by Qays ibn al-As, in Egypt. Therefore, the judicial system remained relatively uncomplicated during the era of Rashidun Caliphate.

Umayyad Caliphate constituted an extension of the period of the Rashidun Caliphate in the selection of judges, who relied on the Quran, the Sunnah, and independent reasoning (ijtihad) to adjudicate among Muslims. The Caliph Abd al-Malik ibn Marwan established the office of the "Sahib al-Mazalim" (Officer of Grievances) to address complex disputes that were beyond the capacity of the regular judge to resolve.

In the eras of the Rashidun Caliphate and the Umayyads, governors initially exercised judicial authority on behalf of the caliph. Matters that the judge found difficult to resolve were retained within the purview of the governor's authority. If a governor did not accept a judge's ruling, the judge was compelled to either resign from the position or withdraw to his home, thereby placing himself in a state of uncertainty.

The judge fulfilled the role of an arbitrator, whose function was to resolve disputes and bring about the cessation of conflicts. This was achieved by the settlement of differences between parties by Islamic law (Sharia) and the presentation of legitimate evidence. However, the judge was not empowered to enforce judgments. Instead, he was tasked with overseeing all matters that impacted the community's life, such as marriage, divorce, guardianship of orphans, inheritance, and more, all of which were governed by Sharia. The "Sahib al-Shurta" (Chief of Police) was responsible for executing the judge's decisions and bringing criminals before him.

== Origin of the position of Great Qadi ==
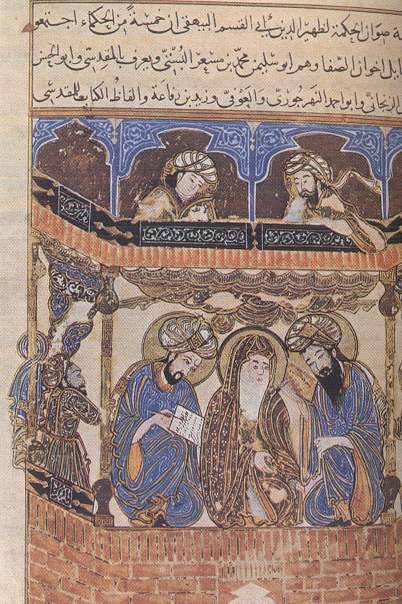
A jurist and his disciples during the Abbasid era.

During the Abbasid era, the judicial system became more complex due to the intricate social life within the Islamic state, especially in the capital, Baghdad, which witnessed new developments in social, cultural, intellectual, and economic life. This period was characterized by the flourishing of translation, Arabisation (Ta'reeb), and the transfer of knowledge from Greek, Syriac, Hindi, and Persian sources into Arabic. A multitude of ethnicities were integrated into the Islamic melting pot, which exhibited an Arab character, resulting in a rich tapestry of opinions, perspectives, and approaches to various aspects of life.

During this period, the principal Islamic schools of thought were fully codified. The six major schools of Islamic jurisprudence are Hanafi, Ja'fari, Maliki, Shafi'i, Zaydi, and Hanbali. Each of these schools addressed and dealt with various matters in a manner that was somewhat distinct from the others. Consequently, the role of the judge necessitated a comprehensive grasp of Islamic law (Sharia) and its intricate nuances, as elucidated by the various schools of thought.

As the demand for judges increased, it became increasingly challenging to identify a sufficient number of individuals with comprehensive knowledge of jurisprudence and Islamic law. Consequently, the selection of judges began to prioritize integrity and sound judgment. To ensure their understanding of jurisprudence, judges could appoint knowledgeable advisors or delay their ruling until they received a well-reasoned opinion from a scholar or experienced judge.

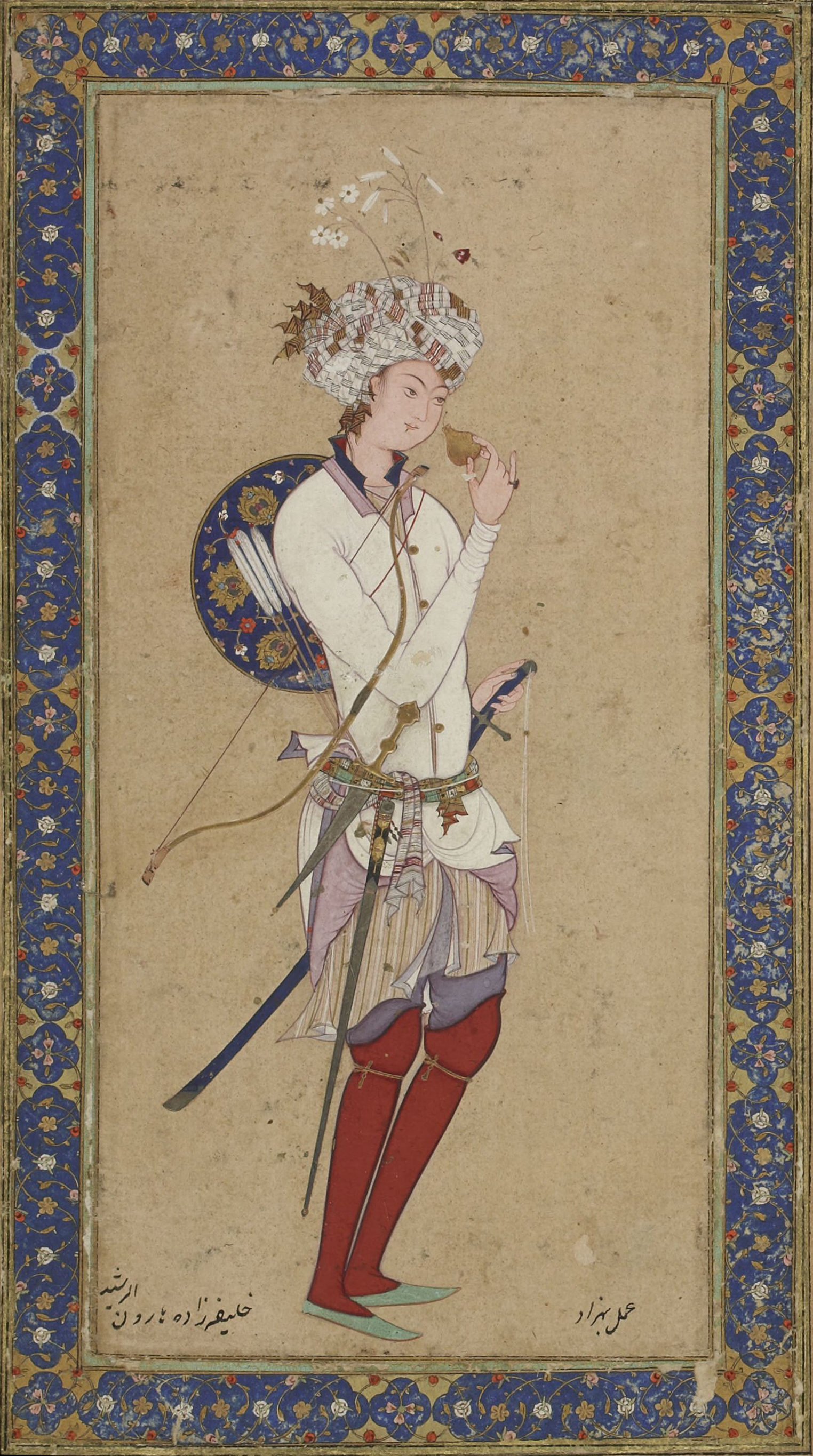
A Persian miniature, showing Caliph Harun al-Rashid in his youth. Al-Rashid was the first to create the position of Qadi al-Quds in Islam.

It can be seen that the role of the Great Qadi (Qadi al-Qudat) was born from the position of judge, which served as the foundation for this new role. It was customary for the caliph to appoint the Great Qadi from among the judges. The office of the Great Qadi was first established by Caliph Harun al-Rashid, marking the advent of this new administrative role within the Abbasid state. The Abbasids, from the caliphate of Abu Ja'far al-Mansur onwards, sought to reinforce the separation of judicial and executive authority by reinforcing the independence of the judiciary and the religious authorities within the state. They drew heavily on Persian administrative systems, including Sassanian judicial position of "Mobedan Mobed," which was Arabised to "Qadi al-Qudat" or "Great Qadi," a position regarded as the highest in religious rank and authority.

The inaugural holder of this office was Imam Abu Yusuf Ya'qub ibn Habib al-Ansari, a disciple of Imam Abu Hanifa al-Nu'man. Abu Yusuf was able to establish a position of judicial independence and became the head of all judges, with Baghdad, the capital of the caliphate, becoming the seat of the Great Qadi. The circumstances surrounding Abu Yusuf's appointment are unclear. However, it is documented that following the death of his teacher, Abu Hanifa, he proceeded to Baghdad. He was summoned before one of the caliph's commanders to provide a legal opinion regarding an alleged violation of oath. He ruled that no violation had occurred, and in recognition of this, he was rewarded with Dinars and a house nearby. Subsequently, Harun al-Rashid sought counsel from a jurist after observing his son engaging fornication. The commander then introduced him to Abu Yusuf, who was asked whether the ruler could punish a man for adultery based solely on his testimony. Abu Yusuf advised that punishments (hudud) could not be carried out solely on the testimony of the ruler. In the case of witnessing an act of adultery, the penalty should not be imposed unless there is corroborating evidence, such as testimony from four male witnesses or a confession by the perpetrator. As the son did not confess and there was no proof of adultery from four male witnesses, the penalty was not applicable. Harun al-Rashid was pleased with Abu Yusuf's verdict and rewarded him generously, granting him a monthly stipend as a scholar and consulting him on religious matters. Eventually, Harun al-Rashid appointed him as the Great Qadi, finding no scholar wiser or more knowledgeable.

Abu Yusuf thus assumed comprehensive authority over all judicial matters within the state, assuming the responsibility of appointing and supervising judges, and dismissing them when necessary. He was referred to as the "Great Qadi of the World" due to his role in appointing judges in all regions under the caliph's rule. The attire for judges and scholars, known as the Persian turban, was introduced by Abu Yusuf, who created a special outfit for judges consisting of a black turban and cloak, thus distinguishing them from the common dress of the time.

From the time of Abu Yusuf's appointment as the inaugural Great Qadi of Islam, the Abbasid era judiciary began to assume the form of an authority led by the Great Qadi, with a hierarchy of judicial roles to facilitate justice across the vast state. The expansion of the state gave rise to the establishment of the office of the Great Qadi, which was followed by the appointment of judges, their deputies, and assistants (secretaries, clerks, and servants), (Note: The social conditions led to an increase in the judge's burdens, and he was forced to relinquish some of his responsibilities to assistants under his authority, whom he appointed to fulfill the duties that were entrusted to him, which was the function of the judge's successor, and most judges were successors to judges. As a result of the increasing burdens placed on the judge, he began to appoint deputies to fulfill all the duties that were entrusted to him: The custodian of the House of Money, the supervisor of the administration of orphan properties and endowments, the guardian of those who are incapacitated, and the imam of the Friday sermon... The judge was also assisted by a scribe to record the judgment decisions and witness statements. The judge's scribe is called a "judgment scribe" and is required to be knowledgeable about halal and haram, disagreement, argumentation, consensus, fundamentals and branches. The judge also had servants who assisted him. The judge would give full and complete trust to the testimony, so he would issue a list of people whose honesty would be recognized in the concept of justice, and one of them would be called the just witness. On the other hand, the agent of lawsuits or the agent of judgment is an employee whose task is to appear before the judges on behalf of a litigant who does not have access to knowledge of Sharia law or whose work does not allow him to do so.) as well as the appointment of reliable witnesses and a supervisor stationed at the judges' doors. The hierarchical organization was designed to streamline the judicial system, which had evolved into an institution where a candidate could progress from judge's deputy to judge, and finally to Great Qadi, the highest judicial position in the state.

During the Abbasid period, the role of Great Qadi was held by a single individual in Baghdad. However, as the state expanded significantly, the provincial capitals, which became centers of independent emirates and states, also appointed their own Great Qadis, like that observed in Baghdad. To illustrate, Cairo had a Great Qadi during the Fatimid and Ayyubid dynasties. The circumstances of Mamluk Sultanate necessitated the appointment of a Great Qadi for each of the four Sunni schools of jurisprudence in cities such as Cairo and Damascus. Similarly, in al-Andalus and Morocco, there were also Great Qadis appointed for the four Sunni schools of jurisprudence.

=== Title of Great Qadi ===
In Sahih Muslim there is a hadith in which the Prophet Muhammad said: "The most disgraceful man near Allah is a man who calls himself (or likes others to call him) Malikul-Amlak (i.e., king of kings)". Based on this, scholars of the Salafi tradition have banned names such as "prince of princes" or "sultan of sultans". There has been debate as to whether the title 'Great Qadi Justice' (Qadi al-Qudat) should be similarly prohibited. Some Maliki scholars believed that the title of 'Great Qadi' should be included in this prohibition. It is said that 'Izz al-Din ibn Jama'ah, a Shafi'i judge, saw his father in a dream and asked him about his condition in the afterlife. His father replied that the name 'Great Qadi' had caused him great harm. He therefore instructed his scribes not to write "Great Qadi" in official records, but to use the term "Judge of the Muslims" instead.

Sheikh Abdullah ibn Abi Jumrah al-Maliki stated that "Great Qadi" fell under the same prohibition as "King of Kings", although the title "Great Qadi" had long been used in the East for the highest ranking judge. He noted that in Maghreb people avoid this title, preferring "Qadi al-Jama'ah" (judge of the community) for the great qadi. Bakr Abu Zayd, a Hanbali scholar, argued that if a person is known for his justice and is colloquially called "Great Qadi", this is unacceptable because "the great qadi" in a comprehensive sense is a title that belongs to Allah alone. Anyone who claims this title is claiming a partnership with Allah in a matter that belongs exclusively to Him, for He is the ultimate judge above all judges. However, if the title is limited in time or place, such as 'Great Qadi of Iraq' or 'Great Qadi of the Levant' or 'Great Qadi of His Era', it is mubah, though not preferable, because it may lead to self-admiration and arrogance, making one unwilling to accept the truth if it contradicts one's opinion. It is permissible only because Allah's judgment is not limited to a specific time or place, so there is no implied participation with Allah in this context. The Shafi'i jurist al-Mawardi forbade calling any king "King of Kings", although al-Mawardi himself was called "Aqda al-Qudat" (the most just of judges). The reason for this was that the title should mean "the most just of the judges of his time", not "the most just of judges in general".

Badr al-Din al-Ayni, a Hanafi scholar, stated that it is forbidden to use the term "Aqda al-Qudat" (the most just of judges) because it implies "the wisest of rulers", which is more extreme than "Great Qadi". He criticised the ignorance of some of his contemporaries who wrote "Aqda al-Qudat" for deputies and "Great Qadi" for the most senior judge in judicial records.

== Great Qadi Madhhab ==
The "Great Qadi" (Qadi al-Qudat) was responsible for appointing judges to adjudicate disputes between people according to Islamic law. To hold this position, the great Qadi had to be a Muslim with a deep knowledge of the principles of religion, jurisprudence (fiqh), and hadith, especially since Islam was the official religion of Abbasid state. It went without saying that the great qadi had to be a Muslim, but his expertise in the rulings of the Qur'an and the Prophetic Sunnah- known collectively as "fiqh"-was the most important requirement for administering justice and resolving disputes. Islamic jurisprudence, derived from religious evidence, served as a link between the people and the primary sources of law: the Qur'an and the Sunnah. However, this derived jurisprudence was characterized by significant differences among scholars due to the different perspectives and interpretations inherent in their reasoning. This divergence led to an extensive body of opinion that allowed followers to adhere to the interpretations of their preferred jurist. This eventually gave rise to the prominent schools of jurisprudence (madhabs) that became widely recognized as sources of religious guidance. Each of these schools had a founding imam, whose rulings were documented and disseminated by his students, gaining followers who adhered to the teachings of their chosen school. Great Qadi usually followed the official madhab of the state, the most widespread. As the Abbasid state expanded significantly, the system of appointing great qadi spread to other regions. For example, it was adopted in Egypt during the Fatimid era, where the great qadi was also titled "Great Qadi" (Qadi al-Qudat), similar to the system in Baghdad.

=== Hanafi, Shafi, Maliki, Hanbali Madhhab during the Abbasid period ===
Baghdad served as the capital of the Abbasid state, where the doctrine of Imam Abu Hanifa held sway until it was formally adopted as the state religion. This led to its propagation among the judiciary and the general populace of Iraq. The dissemination of the Hanafi school in Iraq was facilitated by the efforts of Imam Abu Hanifa's disciples, who propagated his teachings and established his legacy. Abu Hanifa did not author a treatise on jurisprudence. However, his renowned disciple Abu Yusuf, who attained the highest ranks during the reign of Harun al-Rashid, was responsible for establishing the Hanafi school in Baghdad and ensuring its adoption as the official state doctrine. His stance enabled him to appoint only judges who adhered to the Abu Hanifa doctrine, effectively shifting the focus of judicial decision-making to a specific doctrine, even if the judges themselves were mujtahids. This prompted those seeking to influence the judiciary to transition from their own doctrines to Abu Hanifa's, ultimately establishing it as the official sect of the Abbasid state and influencing judges to adhere to it. Additionally, Abu Yusuf played a role in codifying Abu Hanifa's opinions in books, including "Al-Kharraj" and "The Difference between the Opinions of Abu Hanifa and Ibn Abi Leila," which have been accessed by researchers. In light of these considerations, it can be asserted that Abu Yusuf was instrumental in establishing Abu Hanifa's doctrine as the prevailing tenet of the Qadi al-Qadha, and consequently, the Abbasid state. All subsequent Qadis al-Quds, in their capacity as judicial authorities, adhered to the doctrine of Abu Hanifa.

Under Al-Mutawakkil (r. 847–861) the Madhab of Chief qadi was Shafi and later Hanbali, the Hanbali school continued by Abbasids until al-Radi (r. 934–940). Notably al-Mu'tadid sided firmly with Sunni traditionalist orthodoxy from the outset of his reign, forbidding theological works and abolishing the fiscal department responsible for property in escheat, which Hanbali legal opinion regarded as illegal.

=== Ismaili Madhhab during the Fatimid period ===
The establishment of the Fatimid Caliphate in Egypt in 362 AH (973 CE) saw the emergence of a new Great Qadi in Cairo, marking the division within Islamic Caliphate into two distinct entities. Abbasid Caliphate in Baghdad and Fatimid Caliphate in Cairo each had their own Great Qadi, adhering to the Hanafi madhab and the Ismaili madhab, respectively. Al-Nu'man ibn Muhammad, the Great Qadi under the Fatimid Caliph al-Mu'izz li-Din Allah, is regarded as the principal architect of the Fatimid judicial system.

Many individuals served as Great Qadi of Egypt, adhering to the Ismaili Shiite madhab. These include Ali ibn al-Nu'man, his brother Muhammad, during the reign of Caliph al-Aziz Billah, and al-Husayn ibn Ali al-Nu'man and his cousin Abd al-Aziz ibn Muhammad al-Nu'man, during the rule of al-Hakim bi-Amr Allah. Therefore, al-Nu'man, his two sons Ali and Muhammad, and his grandsons al-Husayn and Abd al-Aziz all held the position of Great Qadi of the Fatimid state, thereby making a substantial contribution to the Ismaili madhab.

During this period, a sectarian conflict persisted between the Fatimid Caliphate in Egypt the Abbasid Caliphate in Baghdad, and the Umayyad state of Córdoba. This struggle assumed a distinctly sectarian character, reflecting the doctrinal divergence between the caliphates. The sectarian conflict between the Abbasid and Fatimid caliphates persisted until Saladin ultimately brought an end to Fatimid rule in Cairo in 567 AH (1171 CE), resulting in the eradication of the Ismaili madhab in Egypt, along with all its symbols, including the position of the Ismaili Great Qadi.

=== Shafi'i Madhhab during the Ayyubid period ===
Saladin al-Din al-Ayyubi succeeded his uncle, Asad ad-Dīn Shīrkūh, as minister of Egypt in 565 AH (1169 CE). After the death of the Fatimid Caliph al-Adid li-Din Allah, Salah al-Din became the sole ruler of Egypt, marking the end of the Fatimid Shiite Caliphate. Consequently, Egypt, along with the rest of North Africa and the Levant, returned to the fold of the Abbasid Caliphate, and the Abbasid Caliph's name was once again mentioned in the mosques of Cairo.

Under the Ayyubid dynasty, the position of Great Qadi in Egypt was held by a scholar adhering to the Shafi'i madhab, assisted by a Deputy Great Qadi following the Hanbali madhab. The Shafi'i madhab is known for its reliance on hadith, reason, and analogy. Imam Muhammad ibn Idris al-Shafi'i codified his madhab in his book "Al-Umm." Al-Shafi'i himself visited Egypt, where his madhab became dominant, though he had relatively few followers in Iraq, despite the fact that the Chief Judge of Baghdad, Abu al-Sa'ib Utbah ibn Ubayd Allah al-Hamadhani, was a Shafi'i scholar. Notable figures who held the position of Chief Judge of Egypt following the Shafi'i madhab include Ali ibn Yusuf and Abu al-Ma'ali Abd al-Rahman ibn Muqbil al-Wasiti al-Shafi'i.

=== The Four Madhhabs among Sunnis during the Mamluk Sultanate ===
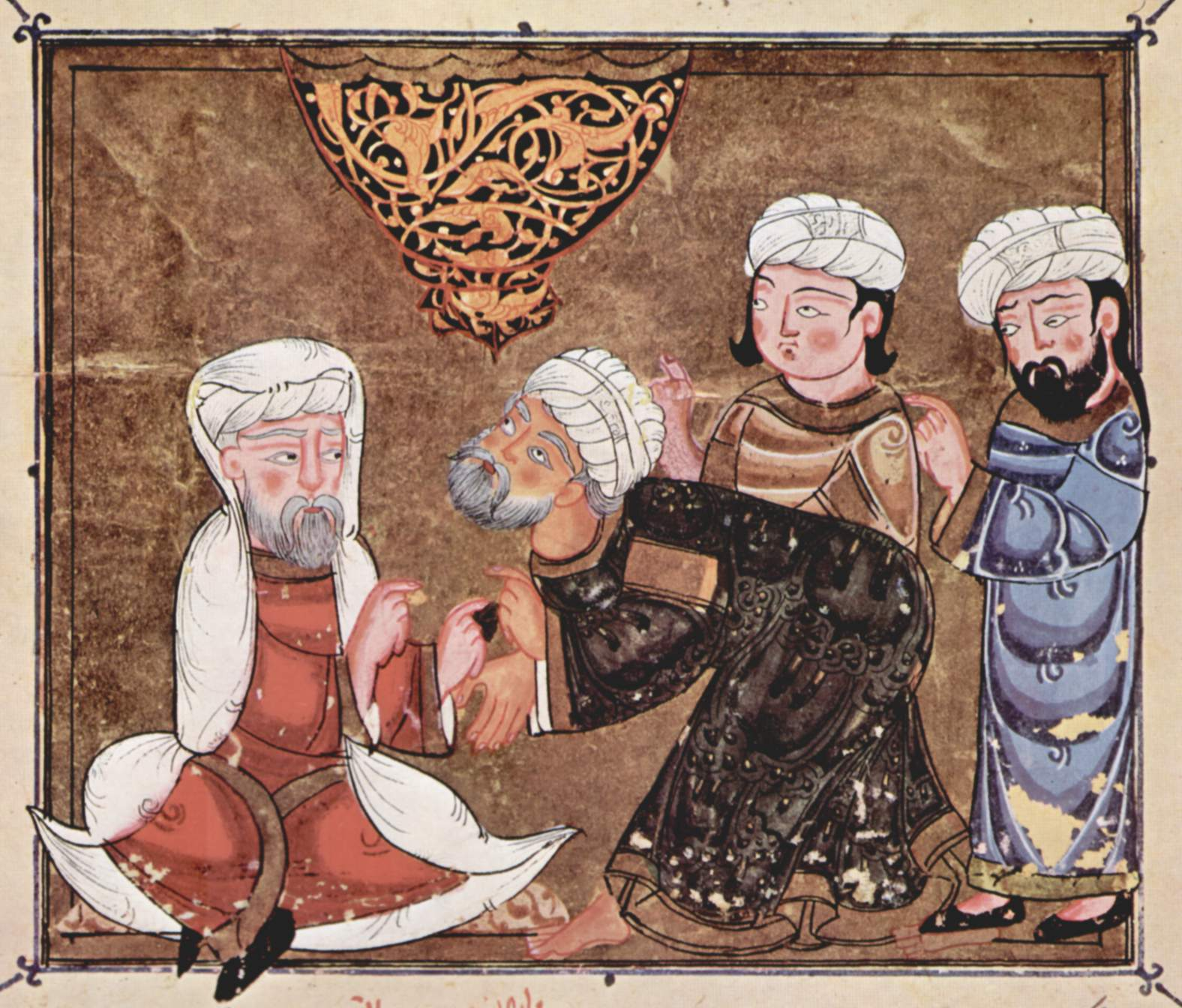
A drawing from 1334 AD, during the Mamluk period of the Abbasid state, showing a man in the presence of the judge of Ma'arat al-Nu'man.

The ascendance of Mamluk Sultanate saw the Shafi'i madhab retain its preeminent position as Great Qadi. Nevertheless, a substantial judicial reform was implemented by Sultan al-Zahir Baybars in 663 AH (1265 CE). Baybars formally prohibited the practice of any madhab that was not aligned with one of the four schools of thought. Hanafi, Maliki, Shafi'i, and Hanbali. This reform was driven by the turmoil that ensued when Ibn Bint al-A'azz, a Shafi'i, was appointed Great Qadi of Egypt in 1261 CE. The varying madhabs often led to judicial conflicts, forcing the Great Qadi to pause on issues that were contrary to the Shafi'i madhab but aligned with other schools of thought.

At this juncture, Emir Jamal al-Din Ayd Ghadi al-Azizi proposed to Sultan Baybars that he appoint independent judges from each of the four madhabs, with each judge ruling according to their respective jurisprudence. Baybars concurred, and at a meeting of the Court of Justice on Monday, 22 Dhu al-Hijjah 663 AH, it was resolved that a Great Qadi would be designated for each of the four madhabs while upholding the primacy of the Shafi'i school. Henceforth, only adherents of one of the four madhabs were eligible for judicial roles, as well as positions in preaching, teaching, or governance.

By 664 AH (1266 CE), Damascus had followed Cairo's example, with each madhab represented by its own great qadi. This system was subsequently adopted across all provinces of the Levant, with four judges representing the four madhabs in each jurisdiction. The Mamluks even resorted to military threats to suppress other madhabs, particularly the remnants of the Ismaili Fatimid madhab.

=== Al-Awza'i and then Maliki in Andalusia ===
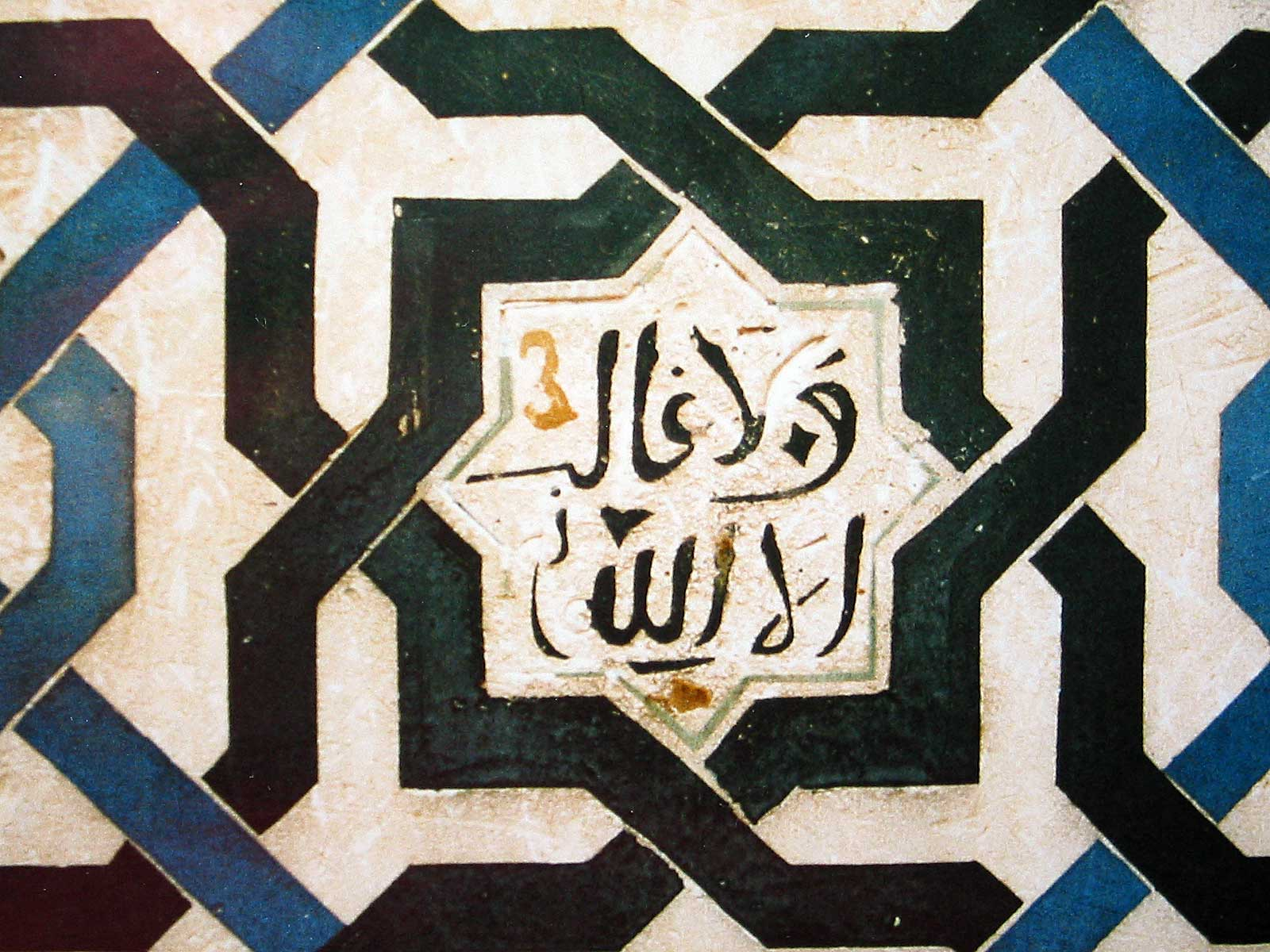
The phrase "There is no victor but Allah" is inscribed in the Alhambra in Andalusia and is the motto of the judges and the judge of the congregation.

Abd al-Rahman al-Awza'i was the most prominent imam in the Levant and was regarded as "the most knowledgeable scholar in the region." His madhab subsequently disseminated from Beirut throughout the Levant and subsequently reached Morocco and al-Andalus, where it remained influential for approximately forty years. During the reign of Emir Abd al-Rahman I (Abd al-Rahman al-Dakhil), the founder of the Umayyad Emirate in Córdoba, great qadi (Qadi al-Jama'a) adhered to the Awza'i madhab. This legal tradition was introduced to al-Andalus by Sa'sa'a ibn Salam when he relocated there.

Nevertheless, during the reign of Emir Hisham I Al-Reda ibn Abd ar-Rahman, Ziyad ibn Abd al-Rahman al-Lakhmi al-Qurtubi, also known as Shabto, introduced the Maliki madhab, which subsequently supplanted the Awza'i school. By the time of Emir Al-Hakam ibn Hisham, Maliki jurisprudence had become the dominant school for legal rulings and fatwas in al-Andalus.

During the period of the Almoravid dynasty, the Maliki madhab exerted a profound influence on the state's policies, with judicial authority concentrated in Marrakesh, the capital. The chief judge of Marrakesh, who was also a member of the Council of Shura, exercised considerable influence over judges in both the Maghreb and al-Andalus. Notable Maliki scholars who held the position of Qadi al-Jama'a or Shaykh al-Jama'a during the Almoravid period included Ibn Rushd al-Jadd, Qadi Iyad, Ibn Hamdan, and Ibn al-Hajj al-Qurtubi.

=== Hanafi Madhhabs during the Ottoman Empire ===
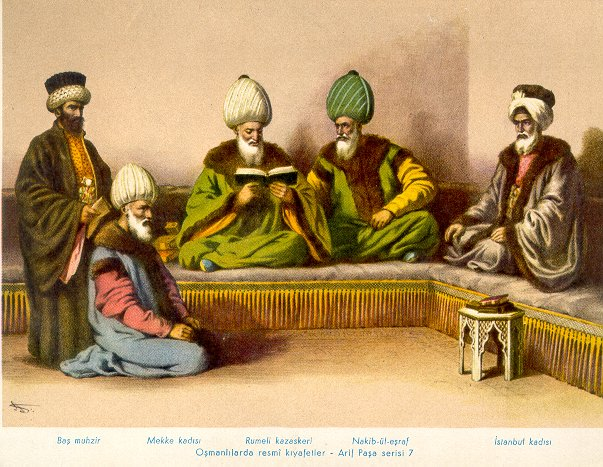
The Ottoman-era military judge of Rumelia.

Following the collapse of the Mamluk Sultanate at the hands of Ottoman forces in 1516, the caliphate underwent a transition from the Abbasids to the Ottomans. This shift saw the Hanafi school of thought regain its status as the official madhab of the Islamic state, while the Shafi'i and Maliki madhabs retained their presence. Great Qadi in Istanbul, the Ottoman capital, became known as the "Qadi al-Askar" (Military Judge), initially serving as the sole great qadi. Over time, two additional judges were appointed to the court, one for Africa and the other for Europe. In the 19th century, Muhammad Ali Pasha, Governor of Egypt, unified the judiciary in Egypt under the Hanafi madhab. Sultan Abdülmecid I followed this approach, taking significant steps toward legal organization by codifying the Ottoman civil law. He instructed leading jurists and scholars to compile Islamic legal rulings into what became known as the "Majalla al-Ahkam al-Adliya". The Majalla, published in 1882, consists of sixteen books, commencing with the Book of Sales and concluding with the Book of Judiciary. Each book is subdivided into chapters and sections, encompassing a multitude of legal subjects. It represents the inaugural comprehensive codification of Fiqh in the civil domain, structured in the form of legal articles, based on the Hanafi school of thought established by Imam Abu Hanifa al-Nu'man.

== The tradition of the Great Qadi ==
The Caliph is the authority responsible for appointing judges to their judicial roles, particularly in the highest judicial position, that of the Great Qadi (Qadi al-Qudat). In certain instances, the appointment and delegation of judges may be conducted by the Caliph's representative in the provinces, such as the Sultan, Governor, or the Great Qado himself. The judge, in turn, appoints his assistants to assist him in various functions. The decree issued by the Caliph for appointing the Chief Judge is known as the "Ahad," or appointment decree, and the appointment ceremony is referred to as the "Taqleed".

=== Requirements for selecting a Great Qadi ===
Initially, there were no specific conditions for appointing the Great Qadi (Qadi al-Qudat). Circumstances played a significant role, as seen when Caliph Harun al-Rashid needed a scholar to advise him on a matter concerning his son's adultery, leading to Abu Yusuf's appointment. Impressed by his legal opinion, Harun al-Rashid created the position of Great Qadi for the first time in Islamic history. Thus, knowledge of Sharia, Islamic jurisprudence (fiqh), and sound judgment were crucial for this selection.

In essence, the qualifications required for a Great Qadi mirrored those needed for an ordinary judge, with additional emphasis on experience and age. Al-Mawardi outlined the conditions required by Islamic law for those who assume judicial roles, summarizing them into seven key criteria:

==== Masculinity and Maturity ====
To be eligible for appointment to the judiciary, a judge must be a man who has reached maturity and is physically and mentally mature. It is not permissible for a minor or a woman to be appointed to this position.

==== Intelligence ====
The judge must possess the capacity to discern and clarify complex cases. An individual who is intellectually deficient or suffers from a mental disability is unsuitable for this position.

==== Freedom ====
A slave may not hold a judicial position. However, if a slave has gained his freedom, he may be eligible for a judicial role if other requirements are met.

==== Islam ====
Non-Muslims are not allowed to serve as judges among Muslims. Jews, Christians, Sabians, Idolatry, Hindus, Buddhists, and others are excluded from this role.

==== Justice ====
This includes qualities such as honesty, integrity, chastity, and avoiding suspicion.

==== Health of Hearing and Sight ====
The judge must have sound hearing and sight to effectively distinguish between right and wrong.

==== Knowledge of Religious Laws ====
This includes knowledge of the Qur'an, the Sunnah (prophetic traditions), and the ability to engage in independent legal reasoning (ijtihad). Al-Mawardi regarded judges as the instruments of justice and the custodians of the Prophet's Sunnah, upholding its tenets in their judgments. He further specified additional qualities that must be considered in the selection of judges, which extend beyond the conditions prescribed by Islamic law. These include:

==== Good Public Behavior ====
The judge should have a favorable reputation in the community.

==== Trustworthiness ====
The judge must be trustworthy and possess a sincere character.

==== Diligence ====
The judge should be diligent and serious, with minimal time spent on frivolous pursuits.

==== Piety ====
The judge should demonstrate high levels of piety and be free from greed. Judges should also emulate the imams and consult scholars and individuals of expertise.

In the initial period, knowledge of the Hanafi school of thought, the dominant school of jurisprudence in Iraq, was a fundamental prerequisite for judicial appointments. This is exemplified by the case of Great Qadi Abu Yusuf. However, knowledge of the four Sunni schools became a crucial element in distinguishing the position of Creat Qadi and in reinforcing its status.

There was no fixed age requirement for judicial appointments. Some individuals assumed the role of judge at relatively young ages, with examples including individuals aged twenty, twenty-two, and thirty-two. Nevertheless, the age of forty was regarded as a benchmark of maturity and wisdom, and it was deemed preferable for judges to possess a distinguished demeanor and age to preclude perceptions of inexperience.

It was relatively uncommon for an individual to assume the role of Great Qadi at an age as young as twenty or thirty years old, despite the absence of a fixed age requirement for this position. It was customary for the position to be held by an individual with considerable judicial experience, a distinguished reputation, and a certain degree of seniority. For example, Abu Ja'far Ahmad ibn Ishaq ibn al-Bahlul al-Tanukhi assumed the role of Great Qadi in Baghdad at the age of sixty-five, while Abu Umar Muhammad ibn Yusuf al-Azdi and Abu al-Saib Atba ibn Ubaidullah al-Hamdhani held the position at seventy-four. Abu Ja'far al-Thaqafi was nearly eighty years of age when he assumed the role in question.

Nevertheless, there are instances where individuals were appointed as Qadi al-Qudat at a relatively young age, often due to their favorable standing with the caliph or their prominent position within the judicial system. Abu al-Husayn Umar ibn Muhammad ibn Yusuf al-Azdi is regarded as the inaugural individual to assume this role in Baghdad before attaining the age of forty. According to al-Tanukhi, Caliph al-Radi Billah visited Mosul in 327 AH (938 CE) with great Qadi Abu al-Husayn Umar (born in 290 AH or 903 CE), who was approximately thirty-seven years of age at the time. It seems reasonable to conclude that he was appointed prior to this date, likely due to his favorable standing with Caliph al-Radi. In Cairo, Ali ibn al-Nu'man assumed the role of Great Qadi at the age of thirty-seven, while his brother Muhammad ibn al-Nu'man held the position at thirty-four. This was largely due to their favorable standing with the Fatimid caliph and the prominence of their father al-Nu'man, who is regarded as the founder of the Fatimid judicial system.

=== Tradition celebration ===
Upon the appointment of the Qadi al-Qudat (Great Qadi), the caliph would issue a formal decree, which would formally establish the assumption of the position. After the issuance of the caliph's decree, a grand "investiture" ceremony would ensue, attended by a considerable assemblage of nobles, judges, witnesses, soldiers, merchants, and others, convened at the caliph's gate.

To illustrate, when Abu al-Husayn Umar ibn Muhammad was designated Qadi al-Qudat, he exited the presence of Caliph al-Radi Billah attired in the customary robe of honor and subsequently traversed the streets of Baghdad in a crowded procession. In Egypt, when the Fatimid Caliph al-Aziz Billah appointed Ali ibn al-Nu'man as Qadi al-Qudat in 366 AH (977 CE), a grand ceremony was held at the Cairo Mosque. The decree was read aloud, and a procession was subsequently held to his residence, accompanied by a considerable number of attendees. Upon assuming the same position in 374 AH (985 CE), his brother, Muhammad ibn al-Nu'man, had the caliph's decree read after Friday prayers at the Old Cairo Mosque.

During the Mamluk era in Egypt, when the Sultan appointed an individual as Great Qadi of a specific school of thought, he would convene the investiture ceremony, during which the individual was presented with a woolen robe and a mule to ride. On occasion, the Sultan would request the services of a judge from outside Egypt, dispatching special couriers to facilitate the appointment of said individual as Great Qadi within the Egyptian judicial system. This signifies that a Great Qadi could be reassigned from Damascus to Egypt, or vice versa, to supervise the judicial proceedings of his school.

Upon assuming the position of Great Qadi in Egypt, the individual would embark on a journey from Damascus to Egypt, accompanied by other judges and notable figures who would bid him farewell. Frequently, his family would be sent ahead of him, traveling in a caravan of camels. Upon arrival in Egypt, Great Qadi would present himself to the sultan and subsequently proceed to the House of Hadith and the Rukniyyah School, where he would be greeted by members of the community.

In Damascus, the investiture would occur upon the arrival of a courier from Egypt with the sultan's decree and the ceremonial robe for the newly appointed or reappointed Qadi al-Qudat. The ceremony would be held in the Umayyad Mosque, where the Great Qadi would be seated in the mihrab, attired in his ceremonial robe. It is noteworthy that there was a mihrab for each of the four Sunni madhabs. The document of investiture would be read aloud in the presence of judges and dignitaries, typically by a senior scholar situated on the platform facing the mihrab. Subsequently, Great Qadi would embark on a grand procession to the House of Happiness (Dar al-Sa'ada) to greet the deputy sultan. On the following day, the Great Qadi would commence his duties, presiding over cases in institutions such as the Nuriyyah, Jawziyyah, or Adiliyyah schools, where he would receive greetings and congratulations from the public.

== Duties of the Great Qadi ==
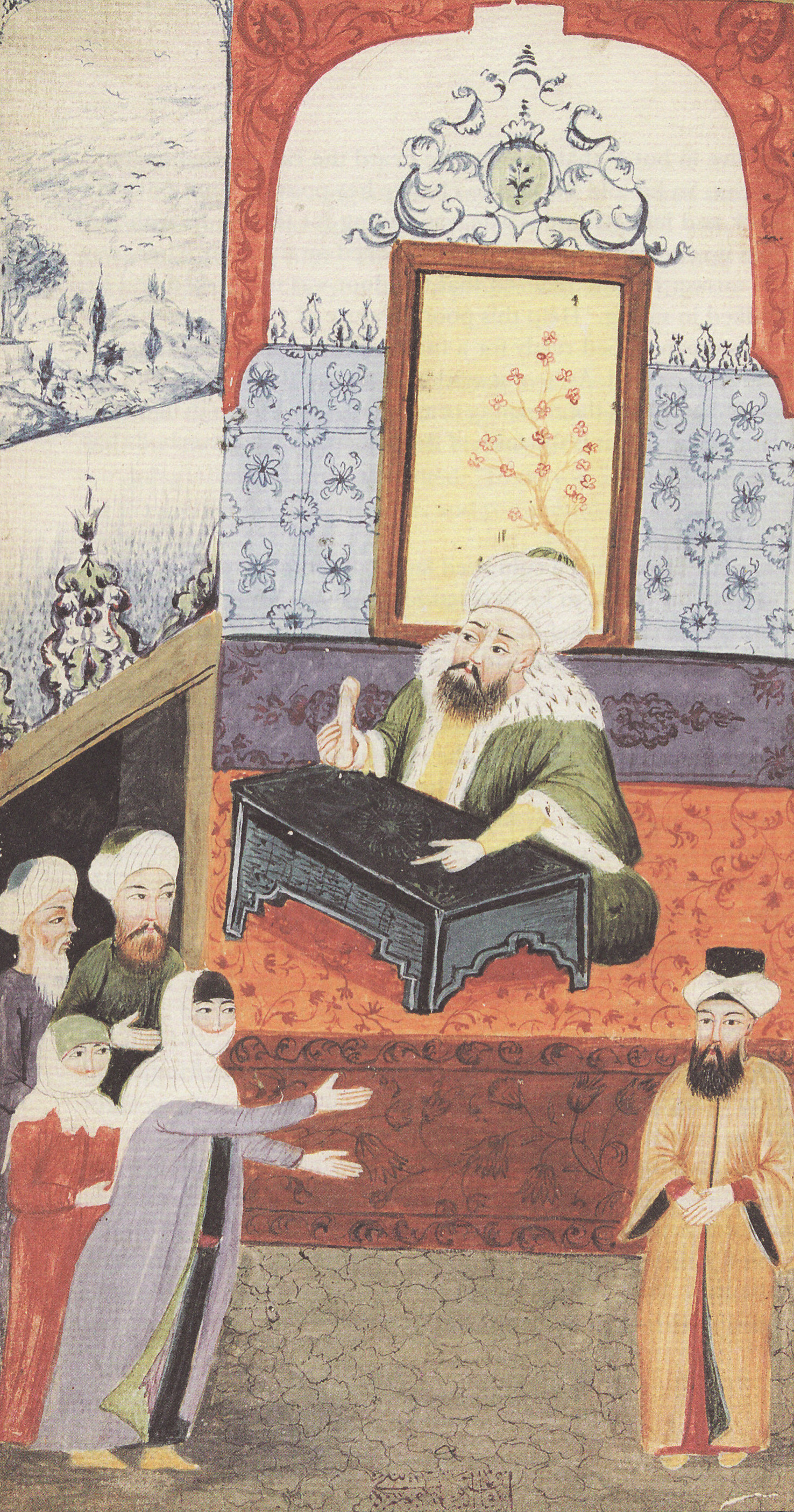
An Ottoman judge gives an opinion to a wife who came to him to complain about her husband.

Following the investiture of the Qadi al-Qudat (Great Qadi), the scope of his responsibilities undergoes a notable expansion. While his primary duty remains the administration of justice and the supervision of judicial proceedings, social circumstances frequently give rise to an increase in his workload, resulting in a significant number of tasks that fall outside the purview of the judiciary. Consequently, the responsibilities of the Great Qadi can be classified into two distinct categories: judicial and non-judicial duties.

=== Judicial Tasks ===
The judicial duties of the Great Qadi include the appointment and dismissal of judges, the trial of ministers and individuals deemed a threat to the state, the drafting of documents of allegiance and deposition for caliphs, the officiating of the sermons and marriages of caliphs and princes, and sometime the supervision of market regulation (hisba), the hearing of grievances, and the issuance of legal opinions (Fatwa).

==== Appointment and Dismissal of Judges ====
It is a matter of significant importance within the judicial system. The caliph bears the responsibility for appointing the Great Qadi, who serves as the chief judge of the entire state. In addition, various judges in different regions act as deputies under the authority of the Great Qadi. Great Qadi is thus invested with the authority to appoint judges in various jurisdictions and to dismiss them when necessary. Imam Abu Yusuf was the inaugural Great Qadi to propose the nomination of judges for appointment during the tenure of Harun al-Rashid. Subsequently, Caliph al-Ma'mun charged his Great Qadi, Yahya ibn Aktham, with the responsibility of examining prospective judges before their appointment, drawing upon the expertise of notable jurists and scholars in Baghdad. In one instance, Yahya ibn Aktham evaluated a candidate for a judicial position by posing a complex legal question. "Please elucidate the relationship between the children of two men who married each other's mothers." When the candidate was unable to respond, Yahya elucidated, "Each of the children is an uncle to the other through his mother." On occasion, a close associate of the caliph exercised considerable influence over the selection of judges. For instance, Muhammad ibn Imran al-Dabbi was entrusted with the task of selecting judges for Caliph al-Mu'tazz Billah, and presenting candidates to the caliph, who subsequently ordered their appointments. Due to his position and influence, judges and scholars would often gather around him, recognizing his authority in the selection process.

==== Trials of ministers and individuals threatening the Caliphate and the religion ====
Qadi al-Qudat (Great Qadi) participated in the trials of ministers accused of conspiring against the state and individuals who claimed theism or prophethood, as well as those who insulted Prophet Muhammad, other prophets, messengers, the Companions, and the Ahl al-Bayt (the Prophet's family). Additionally, those who sought to corrupt Islamic beliefs were also subject to these trials. To illustrate, during the tenure of Caliph al-Mu'tasim Billah in Baghdad, the Great Qadi, Ahmad ibn Abi Du'ad, presided over the trial of al-Afshin in 226 AH (840 CE), (Note: Abu al-Hasan Haydar ibn Kaws, alias al-Afshin, originally from Ashrosneh, was one of the greatest military commanders in the Abbasid state, who put down the revolt of Babak al-Kharmi. He was arrested by Caliph al-Mu'tasim in 225 AH, accused of treason and tried, then brought out dead and crucified at the public gate in 226 AH. He was a tyrant, unruly, and very alienated.) who was accused of Zandaqa. He was sentenced to be crucified at the Bab al-Ammah gate. Other individuals were executed for their mockery of the Prophet Muhammad and Islamic beliefs. These included Dawud ibn Salim al-Ba'albakki, a Christian, and others such as Mahmoud ibn Ibrahim al-Shirazi, who persistently cursed the Companions. Furthermore, the Qadi al-Qudat had the authority to remove the deputy sultan in any city if he was found guilty of persistent injustice, misconduct, or unlawful seizure of wealth.

==== The oath of allegiance and the deposition of caliphs ====
The responsibility of assembling witnesses to record the deposition of one caliph and the oath of allegiance to another was frequently assigned to the Great Qadi. For example, Great Qadi Ahmad ibn Abi Du'ad played a pivotal role in administering the oath of allegiance to Caliph al-Mutawakkil 'ala Allah following the death of al-Wathiq. Similarly, Great Qadi Abu Muhammad Ubayd Allah ibn Ahmad ibn Ma'ruf, in conjunction with four witnesses, documented Caliph al-Muti' li-Allah's abdication. The abdication decree was then read to him, after which the assembled witnesses proceeded to Prince Abu Bakr Abd al-Karim and pledged their allegiance to him as the new caliph. The document of deposition was subsequently signed. Additionally, Great Qadi was responsible for overseeing the washing of the deceased caliph's body, a role that underscored his authority and involvement in state affairs. For example, in Baghdad, Qadi al-Qudat Ahmad ibn Abi Du'ad was responsible for overseeing the washing of Caliph al-Wathiq Billah, while in Cairo, Qadi al-Qudat Muhammad ibn al-Nu'man was in charge of supervising the washing of the Fatimid Caliph al-Aziz Billah.

==== Conducting engagements and marriages of caliphs and princes ====
While regular judges often performed engagements and marriages, the Great Qadi was specifically called upon for marriages involving the children of caliphs and princes. Great Qadi Imam Abu Yusuf, for example, presided over the marriage of Ibrahim ibn Abd al-Malik ibn Salih to Al-Ghaliyah, the daughter of Harun al-Rashid, with a dowry of two thousand dirhams. In 1056 CE (448 AH), the Great Qadi of Baghdad, Abu Abd Allah Muhammad ibn Ali al-Damghani, officiated at the marriage of Caliph al-Qa'im bi-Amr Allah to Khadijah, the niece of Seljuk Sultan Tughril Beg, with a dowry of one hundred thousand dinars. In Cairo, Qadi al-Qudat Muhammad ibn al-Nu'man officiated at the marriage of his son Abd al-Aziz to the daughter of the commander Jawhar al-Siqilli in 985 CE (375 AH), with a dowry of three thousand dinars.

==== Hisbah ====
On occasion, the Great Qadi also assumed the duties of the Hisbah, a role typically reserved for the Muhtasib. In Baghdad, Jamal al-Din ibn Abd al-Hayy ibn Idris al-Hanbali served as both the Qadi al-Qudat of the Hanbalis and the Muhtasib of Baghdad. Similarly, in Egypt, the Qadi al-Qudat of the Shafis, Taj al-Din Abd al-Wahhab ibn Bint al-A'azz, also held the position of Muhtasib.

==== Supervision of complaints (Al-Nazar fi Al-Mazalim) ====
The duties of the Great Qadi also extended to the supervision of complaints (mazalim), although the official in charge of complaints usually dealt with cases that were beyond the jurisdiction of both the judge and the market inspector and had greater authority than either. Qadi al-Qudat Abu al-Qasim Abd al-Aziz ibn Muhammad ibn al-Nu'man combined his judicial duties with overseeing grievances during the reign of Caliph Al-Hakim bi-Amr Allah, where he was known for his harsh rulings and severity towards high-ranking state officials who opposed him.

==== Issuing Fatwas ====
It is a significant aspect of Islamic legal practice. Additionally, the Great Qadi issued fatwas about matters of public interest. For example, the Shafi'i Great Qadi of Damascus, Taqi al-Din al-Subki, was consulted on the question of whether to cull stray dogs due to the risk of rabies and other dangerous diseases such as Scabies. The city's residents appealed to him on the matter, prompting him to issue an order on Friday, 25 Dhu al-Hijjah 745 AH (equivalent to 1345 CE), to remove the dogs and dispose of their carcasses in the moat outside Bab al-Saghir. This was done to prevent the stench from causing harm to the public.

=== Non-judicial Tasks ===
Great Qadi was intimately connected with the caliphs, making him a pivotal intermediary for those seeking favor from the caliph or minister. This notable status frequently led him to accompany the pilgrimage procession. The Great Qadi often assumed various non-judicial roles, including teaching, preaching, overseeing mosques, managing Bayt al-mal, and serving as the chief of scholars. In some instances, his responsibilities extended to holding ministerial positions.

==== Interceding with the caliph or minister ====
As the most senior judicial officer, Great Qadi occupied a position of considerable influence, making him a pivotal intermediary with the caliph and other prominent figures. Due to his elevated status, individuals in need frequently sought his assistance in interceding on their behalf, whether to address personal grievances or to prevent imprisonment and execution. It is noteworthy that Great Qadi al-Mu'tazili Ahmad ibn Abi Dawood was renowned for his ability to secure the release of prisoners and prevent executions. He was successful in his efforts to prevent the execution of Abu Dalaq al-Qasim ibn Isa al-Ajli at the hands of al-Afshin. He also interceded with Caliph al-Mu'tasim Billah to halt the punishment and torture of Khalid ibn Yazid. Furthermore, he petitioned Caliph al-Wathiq to release a man from Yamama and other imprisoned officials and scribes held by Minister Muhammad ibn Abd al-Malik.

==== Accompanying the hajj convoy ====
Great Qadi was occasionally entrusted with the responsibility of leading the Hajj convoy. For instance, in 412 AH (1021 CE), Great Qadi Abu Muhammad al-Nasihi was appointed as the leader of the Hajj and led the people on their journey.

==== Teaching, delivering sermons, overseeing mosques, and serving as the head of elders ====
Great Qadi frequently assumed additional roles, including those of an educator, religious leader, mosque administrator, and leader of the elderly. In Baghdad, for instance, Qadi al-Qudat Qutb al-Din "al-Ahwas" taught at the Mustansiriya School and other academic institutions. When the Qadi al-Qudat conducted educational sessions, they were attended by judges, princes, prominent figures, and scholars.

The administrative divisions of the Ottoman Empire included the Mint, Fortifications, and Treasury Administration. On occasion, the Qadi al-Qudat was charged with the supervision of the mint, fortifications, or treasury administration. In Damascus, Qadi al-Qudat Kamal al-Din al-Shahrazuri was entrusted with the oversight of the mosque, the mint, and the fortifications. Similarly, Qadi al-Qudat Taqi al-Din Muhammad al-Shafi'i and Shihab al-Din al-Shafi'i were assigned roles in the administration and management of the treasury.

==== Dar Al-Darb and Bayt Al-Mal agency ====
The administrative divisions of the Ottoman Empire included Dar Al Darb, Fortifications, and Bayt al-mal Agency. On occasion, Great Qadi was charged with the supervision of Dar Al Darb, fortifications, or Bayt Al Mal Agency. In Damascus, Great Qadi Kamal al-Din al-Shahrazuri was entrusted with the oversight of the mosque, the mint, and the fortifications. Similarly, Qadi al-Qudat Taqi al-Din Muhammad al-Shafi'i and Shihab al-Din al-Shafi'i were assigned roles in the administration and management of the treasury.

==== Jihad ====
While the caliph was ultimately responsible for issuing the call to jihad in the sake of God, the Great Qadi frequently played a supporting role, delivering sermons in mosques to encourage people to engage in jihad. For example, when information was received in Damascus indicating the approach of enemy vessels to the coast of Beirut in 767 AH (1365 CE), Great Qadi Taj al-Din al-Shafi'i delivered the Friday sermon, urging the populace to engage in jihad. He equipped some of his attendants with armor and helmets and prepared to join the campaign himself. Furthermore, Great Qadi occasionally engaged in jihad directly, as evidenced by great qadi Husam al-Din al-Razi al-Hanafi, who fought alongside the Mamluk Sultan against the Tatars in the Wadi al-Khazandar near Wadi Salmiyya, near Homs, in 698 AH (1298 CE).

==== The Caliph's companionship ====
Fostered a close relationship between the Great Qadi and the caliphs, frequently resulting in the latter bestowing upon him the title "Judge of the Caliph." The caliphs would solicit the Great Qadi's counsel on personal matters and would often include him in their travels. Furthermore, the caliph would include the Great Qadi in ceremonial processions. For example, Great Qadi Abu Yusuf accompanied Harun al-Rashid on numerous journeys, and Great Qadi Ali bin Thabyan traveled with the caliph, being present in Khorasan when Harun al-Rashid died in 192 AH (807 CE). Some Great Qadi were held in such high esteem that upon their death, the sultan or caliph, accompanied by the deputy of the sultanate, other judges, and dignitaries, would attend their funeral and procession. This illustrates the elevated status attained by the Great Qadi about the caliphs, whether in Baghdad, Egypt, or Damascus. The profound respect accorded to the Qadi al-Qudat is exemplified by the profound mourning of the caliph al-Radi for the demise of Qadi al-Qudat Abu al-Husayn Umar, which led to his demise shortly thereafter. Similarly, the Fatimid caliph al-Hakim bi-Amr Allah supervised the burial of Qadi al-Qudat Muhammad bin al-Nu'man in Cairo in 389 AH (999 CE).

== Characteristics of the Great Qadi ==
In the discharge of his judicial and non-judicial duties, the Great Qadi was a proponent of a particular legal school and was identifiable by his distinctive attire. He was compensated for his work, though he occasionally declined the remuneration. It was also customary for members of the same family to assume the role of Great Qadi. Despite the privileges associated with this position, the Great Qadi could face legal challenges, including imprisonment and removal from office, for various reasons. Notably, some individuals declined to assume this role, while others competed for it, leading to disputes, particularly when each of the four major legal schools had its own Great Qadi.

=== Great Qadi's uniform ===
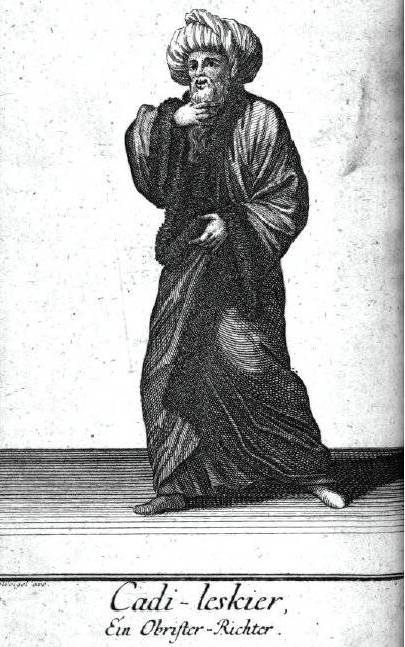
The uniform of the Qadi al-Quda (military judge) in the Ottoman Empire.

The black color, designated as al-Sawad, served as the official emblem of the Abbasid dynasty. The attire of the caliphs consisted of a black cloak, a jeweled crown, and a black woolen cap (qalansuwa). Additionally, they adorned themselves with a necklace and two bracelets of gold inlaid with jewels. Ministers typically wore a shirt, an undergarment, a padded coat (mubattana), black shoes, and a black turban.

Scholars and scribes were attired in shirts, cloaks (ṭayals), and turbans, with the size of the turban varying according to age and rank. Initially, judges did not have a specific uniform. Nevertheless, during the tenure of Abu Yusuf as Great Qadi under the rule of Caliph Harun al-Rashid, a distinctive attire was established for judges. They wore a long black turban over a long cap (qalansuwa). (Note: The hood was considered a sign of masculinity among the Arabs. It was sometimes called a dunya because it was round and resembled a dun in shape, and it was called a tawila when the hood was long and high, and it was also called a taqiya because it encircled the head and held it in place. The hood was made of kaghd, reeds or sable. The most famous hoods are the Rasafi hoods, the black Shashiya hoods, and the Meccan hoods. The tilsan is a piece of cloth in the shape of a semicircle or square, which is placed on the head above the hood and covers most of the face, then two ends of it are turned under the mouth until they surround the neck, and the other two ends fall on the back. The tarha is a piece of conductive gauze, or part of a shawl, which flows to the back of the head after it has been wrapped several times around the hood or turban, and this type of khimar stands at shoulder height and creates a beautiful effect in the appearance of the wearer, and is sometimes embroidered or studded with gold in its edges. The burkan is a thick type of cloth or a robe made of this cloth, while the fauqaniya is the jabba, which was worn only by the judges.) Great Qadi typically wore black attire, similar to that of Abbasid officials, during official occasions, particularly on Fridays when he represented the caliph.

In Baghdad, the Great Qadi would don the cap (qalansuwa) on his head, drape the cloak (ṭayal) over his shoulders, and often select Indian sandals. During periods of elevated temperature, he would use a fan. In instances when he was absent from the presence of the caliph or officials or at home, he would remove his cap due to the heat.

In Egypt, the Qadi al-Qudat was distinguished by a specific headgear, the ṭarḥa, which was a distinctive sign of the Qadi al-Qudat and was exclusively worn by the Shafi'i Qadi al-Qudat. By 663 AH (1265 AD), under the rule of Sultan Baybars, the other three judges (Hanafi, Maliki, and Hanbali) were also permitted to wear the ṭarḥa. Great Qadi of Damascus was attired in the ṭarḥa, barqan, and fawqaniya. He was known to ride fine mules, often with a decorative saddle cover.

In the Fatimid state, the Great Qadi was provided with a grey mule from the caliph's stables, a color that was specific to him and distinct from that of other state officials. During the Mamluk period, the sultan would bestow a woolen cloak and a mule, sometimes costing up to three thousand dirhams, upon the Great Qadi. Following the Ottoman conquest of the Levant and Egypt in 922–923 AH (1516–1517 AD), the attire of the Qadi al-Qudat and judges changed.

=== Great Qadi's salaries ===
The Abbasids established the position of great qadi as a high-ranking and independent role, with a regular monthly salary similar to that of other judges. In Egypt, the Qadi al-Qudat received thirty dinars per month in 155 AH (772 AD). This amount was later increased by Caliph al-Ma'mun to one hundred sixty dinars per month in 198 AH (813 AD).

Upon assuming the role of Qadi al-Qudat in Baghdad, Abu al-'Abbas Abdullah ibn Abi al-Shawarib implemented a system of fiscal responsibility, agreeing to pay two hundred thousand dirhams annually to the treasury of Prince Al-Mu'izz al-Dawla in 350 AH (961 AD).

Conversely, some Qadi al-Qudat elected to forego any salary for their office. For example, when Muhammad ibn Salih al-Hashimi was appointed Qadi al-Qudat in Baghdad in 363 AH (973 AD), he stipulated that he would not receive any remuneration for his role.

In instances where the Qadi al-Qudat retired due to advanced age or infirmity, a pension was occasionally provided. For instance, when Badr al-Din ibn Jama'a retired from his role as Qadi al-Qudat of the Shafi'i school in Egypt in 727 AH (1326 AD), he was granted a monthly pension of one thousand dirhams and ten ardebs of wheat as compensation.

=== Some members of the same family serving as Great Qadi ===
A review of the names of those who held the position of Great Qadi reveals that some families experienced succession in this role, with fathers, sons, and brothers often occupying the position as if it were an inherited profession. Notable families in which multiple members held the position of Great Qadi include the family of Muhammad ibn Abd al-Malik ibn Abi al-Shawarib al-Umayyad, the family of Ismail ibn Hamad al-Azdi, and the al-Nu'man family.

For example, numerous members of the family of Muhammad ibn Abd al-Malik ibn Abi al-Shawarib al-Umayyad held the position of Great Qadi. Al-Hasan ibn Muhammad ibn Abd al-Malik ibn Abi al-Shawarib al-Umayyad occupied the role of Great Qadi in Samarra during the reigns of Caliphs al-Mu'tazz bi-Allah and al-Muhtadi bi-Allah. Following al-Hasan's demise in 261 AH (874 AD), Caliph al-Mu'tamid bi-Allah dispatched his minister, Ubayd Allah ibn Yahya ibn Khaqan, to extend condolences to Ali ibn Muhammad and offer congratulations on his ascension to the role. Ali ibn Muhammad appeared to have inherited the role from his brother, assuming the position of Qadi al-Qudat in 283 AH (896 AD), the same year he died.

=== Blind people serving as Great Qadi ===
Among the rare phenomena, there are instances where blind individuals assumed the position of Great Qadi, or more precisely, instances where some Great Qoda who became blind continued in their office. In Damascus, Ibn Abi Asrun assumed the position of Chief Judge of Damascus in the year 583 AH (1187 CE), despite being blind for a decade before his demise. He compiled a section on the permissibility of blind judges, which contrasts with the Shafi'i school of thought, the school of the Chief Judge during the Ayyubid period. This is contrary to what al-Mawardi indicated, namely that "the soundness of hearing and sight" is one of the essential conditions for holding the position of a judge.

=== Some refused to serve as Great Qadi ===
While some devoted their lives to the pursuit of the esteemed role of Great Qadi, a position held in high regard among the judiciary, others declined to assume this office, citing the significant responsibility associated with the administration of justice, particularly in light of the hadiths that shed light on the challenges inherent in fulfilling the duties of a judge. It has been reported that the Prophet Muhammad said: "who has been appointed a Qadi (judge) has been slaughtered without a knife". These teachings prompted scholars and jurists to regard the role of the judge or Great Qadi with trepidation. There has been considerable divergence of opinion among Muslims about the acceptability of the role of a judge. Some have been unequivocal in their rejection of the position, whereas others have been prepared to accept it on the understanding that the individual concerned was deemed suitable. Sufis referred to judges as "the scholars of this world" and would say, "The scholars are resurrected among the prophets, and the judges are resurrected among the rulers." Among those who notably refused the position of judge or Chief Judge were Imam Abu Hanifa, Ja'far ibn Muhammad al-Tanukhi, Abu al-Fadl al-Hamadhani, and the eminent scholar Burhan al-Din Abu Ishaq Ibrahim al-Fazari.

=== Disagreement Among Great Qoda ===
The appointment of a Chief Judge for each of the four Sunni schools of thought, whether in Egypt or Damascus, necessitated that the Great Qadi of a particular school refrain from interfering in the cases and matters of the Great Qadi of another school. Nevertheless, disagreements occasionally emerged among the Great Qadi themselves regarding matters about endowments and demolitions. Such disputes occasionally occurred between the Great Qadi of the Hanbali school and those of the Hanafi, Shafi'i, and Maliki schools, or between the Great Qadi of the Shafi'i school and the other three Chief Judges. In such cases, the deputy of the sultan was obliged to convene a council at the Dar al-Saada in Damascus to mediate and reconcile between them. On occasion, the sultan himself would issue a decree to reconcile the Great Qadi. Additionally, disagreements emerged between the Great Qadi and the scholars. For instance, when the Great Qadi Taqi al-Din al-Subki of the Shafi'i school criticized Sheikh Ibn Qayyim al-Jawziyya for his frequent fatwas on the issue of divorce, Prince Sef al-Din bin Fadl al-Arab intervened and facilitated a reconciliation between them in the garden of the Chief Judge.

=== The trial, imprisonment, dismissal and exile of the Great Qadi ===
To attain the position of Great Qadi (Qadi al-Qudat), it was necessary to gain favor with the ministers and caliphs, as well as proximity to them. Nevertheless, it would be erroneous to assume that the Great Qadi was thereby invested with the status of an autonomous ruler, immune to criticism. In essence, Great Qadi was akin to any other official appointed by the ruler and thus subject to dismissal at the ruler's discretion. The role of the Great Qadi inevitably placed him near the caliph or minister. The Abbasid period was characterized by a lack of stability. Those in authority were perpetually threatened by conspiracies and struggles for power. Upon the abdication of a caliph, the successor would promptly replace ministers, which could impact the status of the Great Qadi who had supported the dismissed minister.

In the context of the ongoing power struggles among ministers, the position of the Great Qadi was inherently vulnerable, as the minister's displeasure could potentially lead to the caliph's anger and potentially disastrous consequences. Upon assuming the role of Great Qadi, individuals needed to exercise exceptional caution about their positions and opinions, given that the caliph's wrath could prove to be more severe than that of a minister.

One particularly tragic account concerns the experiences of Great Qadi Ahmad ibn Abi Du'ad, who was compelled to pledge his allegiance to the caliph al-Mutawakkil following the demise of al-Wathiq. Consequently, al-Mutawakkil had him removed from office and confiscated his and his children's properties. Similarly, the Fatimid Great Qadi al-Husayn ibn Ali al-Nu'man was dismissed by al-Hakim bi-Amr Allah, who then proceeded to execute and burn his body.

Rivalries and enmities between the Great Qadi and influential figures could result in humiliation, trial, dismissal, and even imprisonment. In Damascus, for example, the animosity led to the command from al-Mu'azzam Isa to Great Qadi Zaki al-Din al-Tahir ibn Muhammad to wear a red cloak and yellow slippers while judging, which ultimately resulted in his death in 617 AH (1220 CE).

In certain instances, the Great Qadi himself could be subjected to trial if the Deputy Sultan were to oppose him. The proceedings were conducted at the Dar al-Saada in Damascus, where the Deputy Sultan convened a distinguished assembly of judges and eminent scholars representing diverse schools of thought. Additionally, the Great Qadi could be adversely affected by the power struggles between the Sultan and the princes. For example, in 759 AH (1358 CE), the Atabeg Sarghatmish dismissed the three Great Qoda of Damascus—Shafi'i, Hanafi, and Maliki—and appointed new ones. Nevertheless, Sarghatmish was subsequently incarcerated, and the sultan directed the reinstatement of the dismissed judges.

In some instances, a Great Qadi might choose to resign voluntarily, citing fatigue from the demands of the position. In addition to the aforementioned consequences, the Great Qadi could also be exiled. On Tuesday, 12 Shawwal 760 AH, a decree was issued exiling Chief Judge Baha al-Din Abu al-Baqa' al-Shafi'i from Damascus to Tripoli without any official duties. This decision distressed him and his family and elicited sympathy from many. Some Great Qoda even suffered from the influence of women in the judiciary and their interference in judicial matters.

== The demise of the office of Great Qadi ==
The office of Great Qadi (Qadi al-Qudat) endured from the early Abbasid period until the early 10th century CE. During the second half of the 8th century, it reached its apogee. However, this period of relative stability was short-lived, as the position of Great Qadi gradually declined due to the weakening of the Abbasid state and the emergence of independent emirates and principalities within its realm. There were few noteworthy developments until the Mamluk period when Sultan Baybars established a Great Qadi for each of the four Sunni schools of jurisprudence in both Cairo and Damascus. Nevertheless, the Great Qadi did not regain the prestige and authority it had during its golden age of legislation and justice.

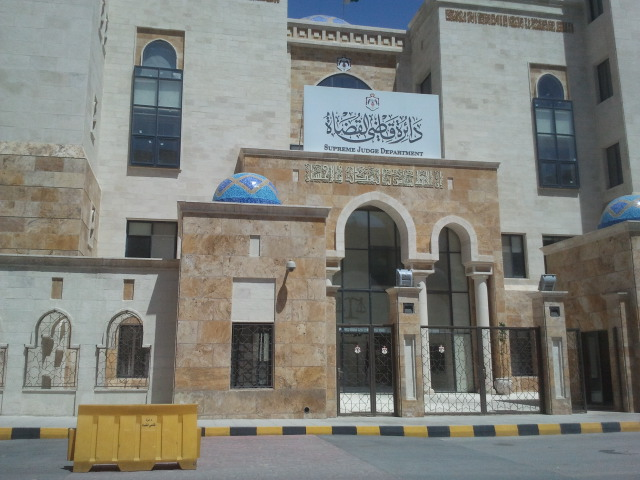
The Office of Qadi Al-Quda in Amman, Jordan.

In the late Ottoman period, Sultan Mahmud II and later his son Sultan Abdulmejid I introduced numerous European legal systems to modernize the state's administrative and judicial frameworks, while simultaneously maintaining Islamic law as the foundation of Ottoman law. The final blow to the institution of the Great Qadi was the advent of European colonialism following the collapse of the Ottoman Empire. The Europeans introduced foreign laws and established new courts that competed with and undermined the jurisdiction of the Sharia courts. Additionally, emigrants to Europe played a role in bringing new ideas back to their homelands, which limited the Sharia courts to personal status matters such as marriage, divorce, alimony, custody, and endowments. As a result, the Sharia courts, which had previously adjudicated all types of cases, were relegated to personal status matters.

Turkey, as the successor to the Ottoman state, adopted a secular system, which resulted in its courts aligning with European legal norms. Consequently, the Sharia courts faced the same fate as those in the Arab world. The newly independent Arab countries inherited this new reality, which led to the evolution of the Great Qadi institution into the position of Sheikh al-Islam. The Sharia courts were presided over by the mufti and predominantly adhered to the Hanafi school in the majority of Arab countries. Meanwhile, the Ja'fari school remained among the Shiites in Lebanon, Iraq, and Iran, and the Zaydi school was observed among the Zaidis in Yemen. The role of the Great Qadi was effectively abolished, with its residual functions being incorporated into the duties of the mufti and associated courts. In contrast, the Minister of Justice and the courts under his purview assumed the primary roles and responsibilities previously held by the Great Qadi, which constituted the bedrock of judicial authority in Islam. (Note: The head of the Sharia courts in Jordan is still known as the "Qadi al-Quda", and he heads a special department known as the Qadi al-Quds Department, which was established with the formation of the first civilian government after the establishment of the state in 1921. The department is responsible for supervising the Jerusalem and Jerusalem Sharia Courts of Appeal. The Qadi al-Quds also handles personal status issues, although he bears the same name as his predecessors during the Islamic Caliphate.)

== Notable holders of the position ==
- Abu Yusuf (182 AH) considered the first to hold the position of the Great Qadi in Islam, He organized the judiciary and his madhab, Imam Abu Hanifa of the Abbasid state.
- Yahya ibn Aktham (d. 857) was a ninth century Arab Islamic jurist. He twice served as the chief judge of the Abbasid Caliphate, from 825 to 833 and 851 to 854.
- Ahmad ibn Abi Du'ad, (d. June 854) was an Islamic religious judge (qadi) of the mid-ninth century. A proponent of Mu'tazilism, he was appointed as chief judge of the Abbasid Caliphate in 833, and became highly influential from 833 to 847/848.
- Muhammad ibn Ahmad al-Iyadi, (d 854) was an acting chief judge (qadi) of the mid-ninth century. He was an acting chief judge of the Abbasid Caliphate in 848, however he was merely a puppet of the Abbasid caliph al-Mutawakkil.
- Ja'far ibn Abd al-Wahid ibn Ja'far al-Hashimi (d. 871/2?) was a Shafi chief judge of the Abbasid Caliphate, from 854 to 863/4.
- Ja'far ibn Muhammad ibn Ammar al-Burjumi (died 866) was a chief judge (qadi al-qudat) of the Abbasid Caliphate.
- Abu Bakr al-Khassaf, (d. 874) was a Hanafite law scholar (Qadi) at the court of Abbasid Caliphate, from 869 to 870.
- Omar al-Azadi (328 AH), the position was held during the reign of the Abbasid caliph al-Muqtadir.
- Abu al-Sa'ib al-Hamadani (350 AH), held the office of Great Qadi (Qadi al-Qudat) of Baghdad from 338 AH until his death. He is regarded as the inaugural figure to occupy this role from the Shafi'i school of thought in Baghdad.
- Ibn Umm Shayban al-Hashmi (369 AH) served as the Great Qadi (Qadi al-Qudat) of Baghdad. According to historical accounts, upon assuming this role, he declared that he would not receive any salary for his duties and would not accept intercession on his behalf.
- Ubaydallah ibn Ahmad ibn Ma'ruf, was thrice chief qadi in Iraq for the Abbasid Caliphate under the Buyid Amir ul-Umara.
- Muhammad ibn Abi al-Shawarib, was a 10th-century Muslim jurist who served as chief qadi of the Abbasid Caliphate from September 944 to 16 September 945 and January 946 to January/February 947.
- Abdallah ibn Abi al-Shawarib, Sunni Muslim jurist who served as chief qadi of Baghdad from 961 to June 963.
- Ibn Zakwan (413 AH) served as the Great Qadi (Qadi al-Qudat) of al-Andalus.
- Al-Qadi Abd al-Jabbar (415 AH).
- Abu Muhammad al-Yazuri (450 AH) was appointed as Qadi al-Qudat (Great Qadi) in 442 AH.
- Abu al-Hasan al-Mawardi (450 AH), the title "Aqda al-Qudat" (Chief of the Judges) was introduced, initially in 429 AH. While Abu Yusuf was the inaugural Great Qadi in Islamic history, Al-Mawardi was the first to assume the title of Aqda al-Qudat, signifying a pivotal advancement in the judicial hierarchy of the Islamic world.
- Abu al-Tayyib al-Tabari, (450 AH), An Islamic jurisconsult, professor of legal sciences and was an Abbasid chief judge. He is regarded by his peers as one of the greatest Shafi'i jurist in the 5th/11th century. In addition, he was a traditionist, linguist and poet.
- Abu al-Qasim al-Zaynabi (543 AH) was designated by the Abbasid Caliph al-Mustarshid.
- Imad al-Din Abu Salih al-Kilani (633 AH) was the inaugural Hanbali to assume the role of Qadi al-Qudat (Great Qadi).
- Shams al-Dīn Abū Al-ʿAbbās (681 AH) occupied the role of Qadi al-Qudat (Chief Judge) of the Shafi'i school in Damascus.
- Sheikh al-Islam Nasir al-Din al-Baydawi (685 AH)
- Shaykh al-Islam Ibn Daqiq al-'Id (702 AH)
- Ali ibn Makhlouf (718 AH). He served as the Great Qadi of the Maliki school in Egypt.
- Shaykh al-Islam Badr al-Din ibn Jamāʿa (733 AH) was a prominent Islamic scholar.
- Izz al-Din ibn Jamāʿa (767 AH).
- Taqi al-Din al-Akhnāʾī (750 AH). Great Qadi of the Maliki school in Egypt.
- ʿAṣad al-Din al-Ijī (756 AH). He subsequently assumed the role of Great Qadi of the eastern regions, which encompassed Mosul, Sinjar, the Jazira, Diyarbakır, and Raqqa.
- Shaykh al-Islam Taqi al-Din al-Sibki (756 AH)
- Shaykh al-Islam Taj al-Din al-Subki (771 AH) was a prominent figure in Islamic jurisprudence. He served as Great Qadi in Damascus.
- Siraj al-Din al-Ghaznawi (773 AH).
- Muhammad ibn Abd al-Rahman al-Dimashqi al-Othmani (780 AH or circa 800 AH).
- Shaykh al-Islam Siraj al-Din al-Balqini (805 AH)
- Shaykh al-Islam Jalal al-Din al-Balqini (824 AH).
- Shaykh al-Islam Zakariya al-Ansari (926 AH).
- Jalal al-Din Davani (918 AH or 928 AH). Great Qadi of Fars.
- Shihab al-Din al-Khafaji (1069 AH).
