= Hadith manuscripts =

List of extant Islamic texts 632–1232 CE

There are numerous hadith manuscripts from the first four centuries after the death of Muhammad (632 – 1032 CE). The number increases drastically in the following two centuries (1032–1232).

== 632-1032CE ==
=== MS. Leiden Or. 298 ===
This is a book titled Gharib Al-Hadith. It was written by an early Islamic scholar, Abu Ubaid al-Qasim bin Salam (770-838). There's an incomplete manuscript of this book dated back to 252 AH (866CE). It is now kept at Leiden University Libraries. A digital version of the manuscript is available via Leiden University Libraries’ Digital Collections.

=== Jami' of Ma'mar ibn Rashid ===
This is one of the earliest collection of hadith that was compiled by Imam Ma'mar ibn Rashid. Two manuscripts of this book have been found in Turkey. One of them is from Ankara and dating back to 364 AH (974CE). Another one is in Istanbul.

=== Ar-Risalah ===
This book was written by the early Islamic scholar, Shafi‘i. Even though this is not a book written specifically in the field of hadith, it still contains dozens of hadiths. There are two manuscripts of this book at the National Library in Cairo. The first known as the manuscript of Ibn Jama'ah and the second one is the manuscript of Ar-Rabi'. Bernhard Moritz, the German orientalist dates the Ar-Rabi's manuscript to the middle of fourth century AH while Ahmad Muhammad Shakir dated it to shortly before 270 AH (883CE).

=== Abridged Sahih Bukhari ===
This is the oldest arabic manuscript kept at the National Library of Bulgaria. It was dated to 407 AH (1017CE). It contains books 65 through 69 of Sahih Bukhari but book 65 is incomplete. It can be viewed online at World Digital Library official website.

== 1033-1232CE ==
=== Khuda Baksh Library No. 191 ===
It is one of the oldest copies of Sahih Muslim. This copy has an Ijazah, leading to the author Muslim bin Hajjaj. While it has not been carbon dated yet, based on the notes on the margin it is evident that this copy was made before 486 AH (1093 CE) as one of the people that studied it is Abū Bakr Muhammad Bin Zahid al-Ṭūsī who died in the year 486 AH.

=== Al-Assad National Library no. 9388 ===
This is a manuscript of Sahih Muslim of Imam Muslim. It was kept at the Al-Assad National Library in Damascus, Syria and was dated to the fifth century AH/11th century CE.

=== Khuda Baksh Library No. 218 ===
This is a fine incomplete copy of Sunan Nisai. The scribe divided this into several parts out of which 7th, 8th and a portion of 10th part survive. While it has not been Carbon Dated yet, based on the notes this manuscript was studied by several famous traditionalists such as

- Abu al-Hassan Masad al-Khair Bin Muhammad Bin Mahl al-Asari (d. 541 AH/1144 CE)
- Abu al-fazal Muhammad bin Naser bin Muhammad bin Ali al-Baghdadi (d. 550 AH/1153 CE)
- Abu al-Nakhib Abdal Qahir Bin Abdullah Bin Muhammad Bin Amaryah al-Sahr wardi (d. 563 AH/1166 CE)

=== MS Leiden Or. 101 ===
This is a manuscript of Jami' At-Tirmidhi of Imam Muhammad bin Isa At-Tirmidhi. It was dated to 540 AH (1145 CE) and is now preserved at Leiden University Libraries. A digital version of the manuscript is available via Leiden University Libraries’ Digital Collections.

=== Manuscript of Sahih al-Bukhari ===
This is a 20 folio manuscript of Sahih Bukhari which is located in Qatar National Library. It was written in 1174-1175 CE (569-570 AH). The text is in Andalusi script, using black ink. This manuscript was most probably produced in Al-Andalus. A digital version of this manuscript is available online.

=== Khuda Baksh Library No. 211 ===
This is an incomplete Copy of Sunan Tirmidhi which was written in the year 572 AH (1176 CE) in fine bold naskh script. It contains 269 Folios, 22 lines each. An Ijazah is also mentioned leading to the author Al-Tirmidhi. The text has been collated with several notes.

=== Khuda Baksh Library No. 209 ===
This is a very old copy of the 3rd and last part of Sunan Abi Dawood written in naskh script. It contains 191 folios, 22 lines each. A colophon states that this copy was written in Alexandria in the year 576 AH (1180 CE) and compared with another copy which belonged to Sanad Bin 'Inan al Azdi(d. 541 AH/ 1146 CE) who copied it from another copy belonging to Tartusi(d. 520 AH/ 1126 CE). From Tartusi the scribe mentions an Ijazah leading to the author Abu Dawud al-Sijistani. A letter of Abu Dawud describing his sunan to the people of Makkah is also present on the folios with the same chain of narration.

=== Princeton University library Garrett no. 4999Yq ===
This manuscript contains 4 complete Books written by Abu Dawud al-Sijistani:

1. Sunan Abi Dawood
2. Risālat Abu Dāwūd
3. Kitab Al-Marasil
4. Tasmiyat shuyukh

It is written in black Maghrebi script on Glazed light cream paper with horizontal laid lines still visible. It contains Collation notes, Marginal notes and Catchword on the verso of each leaf, written on 243 pages (26.5 by 13.7 cm), 41 lines each page. It is stated that the copy was completed on Friday 25 Ramadan 589 AH (24 September 1193 CE).

=== Khuda Baksh Library No. 255 ===
This is a Manuscript of Musnad al-Firdous written in naskh script. It is not dated but apparently it is from 13th century CE/ 7th Century AH.

=== Khuda Baksh Library No. 241 ===
It is one of the oldest copies of Musnad al-Tayalisi. It contains an Ijazah ending with Abu Dawud al-Tayalisi. It is divided into 10 parts. Each except the ninth part(which is slightly defective at the end) has autographs of many male and female traditionalists, numbering not less than 300, all in the 7th and 8th century AH who studied from this manuscript. A note dated 707 AH(1307 CE) says that Abdallah Bin Ahmad Bin Abdallah studied the work jointly with Al-Dhahabi, Bali and others from the present copy under Ibn an Nuhhas in Madrasa Ashrafiyah of Damascus. This copy, through not carbon dated is evident that it was made in or before 7th century AH. Another note also says Afifaddin, studied this manuscript under Ibn Khalil(d. 648 AH/1250 CE). It consists of 344 folios, 20 lines each.

== 1233-1432CE ==
=== Khuda Baksh Library No. 245 ===
This is an incomplete Copy of Musnad Ahmad ibn Hanbal in naskh script. It contains 1776 Hadith. A note towards the end tells us that Ahmad az Zaftawi, a decentand of Siraj al Hindi, and a Qadi al-Qudat of Egypt sold this manuscript to Madrasah Muhmadiya in Samarkand and another note states that this copy was compared with a copy of the Musnad that belonged to Shaikh Muhammad Khalil al Makki in 633 AH (1235 CE). It was also studied by "Ahmad Bin Muhammad Bin Umer Bin Abdullah bin Abd an Nasir" who according to the autograph note of his father, was born in 603 AH (1206 CE). While this manuscript has not been carbon dated yet, it was made either in or before 633 AH (1235 CE).

=== Manuscript of Sunan Abi Dawood ===
This is a manuscript of Sunan abi dawud which is dated from 1250-1299 CE (648-699 AH) written in Cairo and contains 79 pages. It is located in Michigan library.

=== Princeton University Library Garrett no. 95Y ===
This is a manuscript of fourth part of an abridgement of Sunan Abi Dawud. According to the end of this copy, the work was completed by its author on Monday, 7 Dhu al-Qadah 654 AH (26 November 1256 CE) in Dar al-hadith. A note at the end of the text gives biographical details on the author, and also mentions a fire that occurred in Medina that year (654 AH). It consists of 257 pages (26.5 by 17 cm), 27 lines per page written on thick light cream paper, glossy, with thick laid lines, pulp, and a few chain lines visible. Red ink is used for headings and entries. The last letters of a word at the end of the line are sometimes written on the margin.

=== Dublin copy of Sahih Bukhari ===
This is a manuscript of Sahih Bukhari kept at Chester Beatty Library in Dublin Ireland (no. 4176). It was copied by Ahmad bin Ali bin Abdul Wahhab in the fine calligraphic naskh script and was dated to 8 Muharram 694/ 28 November 1294.

=== King Saud University No. 2468 ===
This copy of Sahih Muslim was written ]in 8th century AH (14th century CE) in fine naskh script. It consists of 298 pages(26.5 by 18 cm). A digital version of this manuscript is available online.

=== King Saud University No. 673 ===
This copy of Sahih Bukhari was written in 8th century AH. It consists of 231 pages(26 by 17.5 cm). A digital version of this manuscript is available online.

=== King Saud University No. 4279 ===
This is a partial copy of Sahih Bukhari was also written in 8th century AH. It consists of 19 pages(17 by 24.8 cm). A digital version of this manuscript is available online.

=== Manuscript of Sahih Muslim ===
This is an illuminated manuscript of Sahih Muslim located in National Library of Israel. It was copied by the scribe "Muḥammad bin ʿAlī bin ʿAbd al-Raḥmān al-Jandī al-Qirīmī" and completed on the first day of Sha'ban in 711 AH (13 December 1311 CE). It compromises of 405 pages (27.8 by 40.3 cm), written in Damascus. It also includes at Ijazah leading to Muslim Bin Hajjaj. A digital version is available online.

=== Khuda Baksh Library No. 212 ===
This is an Incomplete manuscript of Sunan al-Tirmidhi. The manuscript bears an Ijazah dated 707 AH (1307 CE) granted by "Yusuf Bin Abdal Hadi" to some of his students.

=== Manuscript of Sahih Muslim ===
This is a Manuscript of Sahih Muslim located in National Library of Israel which was written in the year 748 AH (1347 CE). It was originally written in four volumes of which three survive today. Two of the three manuscripts are illuminated. A digital version is available online.

=== MSS 311 ===
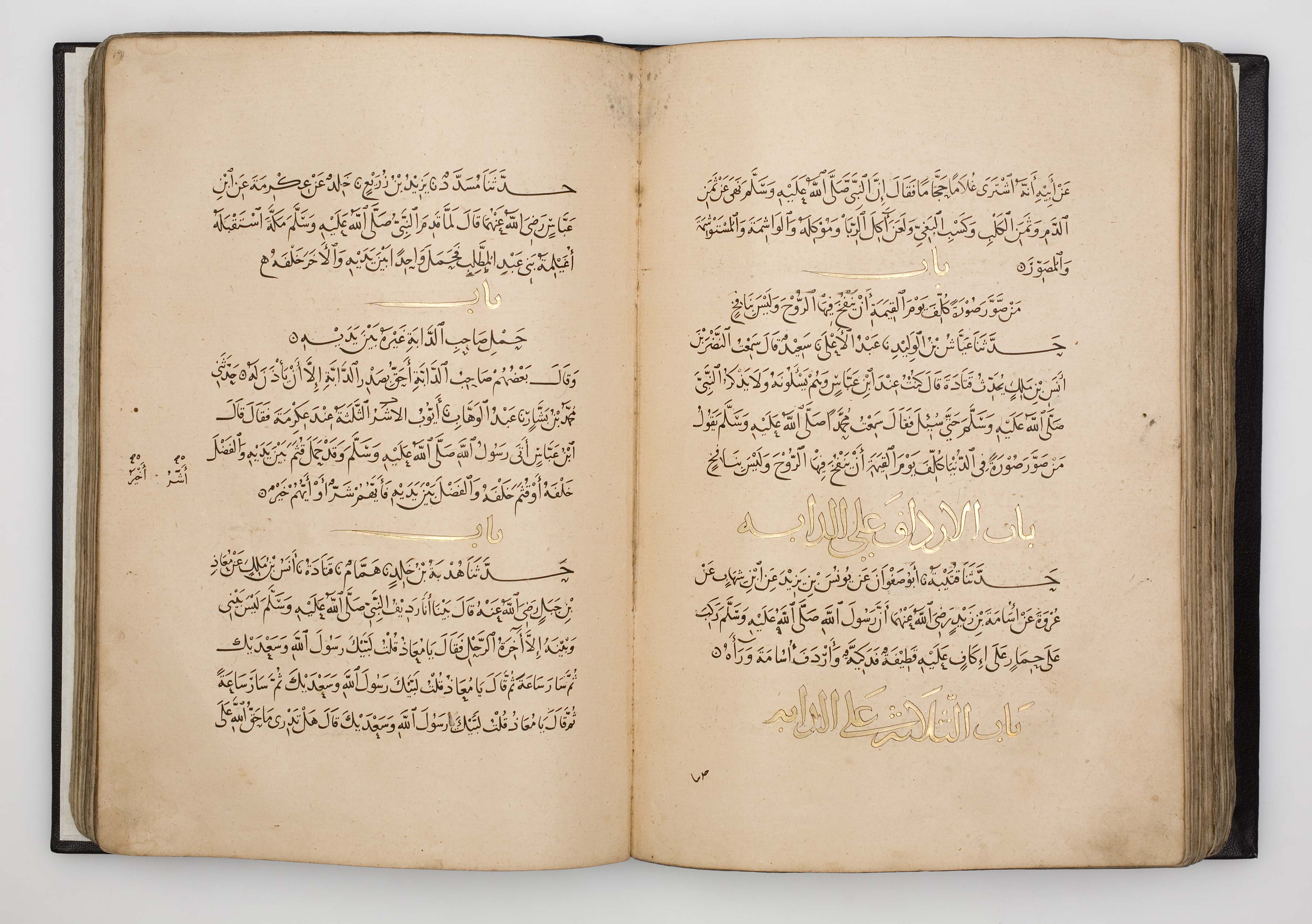
MSS 311

This is a Complete copy of Sahih Bukhari in a single Volume which is preserved in Khalili Collection of Islamic Art from late 14th century to early 15th century CE, probably written in Egypt. It consists of 252 folios (30.5 by 21 cm) written in ink, gold and opaque watercolour in naskh script.

=== Princeton University Garrett no. 687H ===
This is a manuscript of Sahih Bukhari. It consists of 293 Pages(26.7 by 16.3 cm), 17 lines each. It contains a few marginal notes and glosses. The last eight folios pertain to another section. It is Rubricated with vowel signs on paper tinted reddish-brown papers. The manuscript is in poor condition with loose, worm-eaten, stained and fragile pages. It was written in 14th century CE.

=== Princeton University Garrett no. 2506q ===
This is a manuscript of sahih bukhari which was written in 14th Century CE. A digital version of this manuscript is available online.

=== Khuda Baksh Library No. 2984 ===
This Manuscript of Sahih Bukhari is located in Khuda Baksh Library which was completed in Muharram 778 AH (May/June 1376 CE). It is written in naskh script and slightly damaged but repaired recently.

=== Khuda Baksh Library No. 136 ===
This is a Manuscript of the first part of Sahih Bukhari also written in the year 778 AH (1376 CE) in fine naskh script. It was copied by the scribe "Ibrahim Bin Yusuf Bin Ali Al-Maghribi Al-Marini".

=== King Saud University No. 288 ===
This is a fine copy of Volume 3 of Sahih Muslim copied in the year 791 AH (1388 CE). It compromises of 181 pages (26 by 20 cm). A digital version of this manuscript is available.

=== Manuscript of Sahih Bukhari ===
It is a fine copy of the sixth volume of Sahih Bukhari written in the year 791 AH (1389 CE). It contains 226 pages at is located in Michigan library.

=== Princeton University Garrett no. 688H(ii) ===
This is a manuscript of the twenty-first volume of a copy in 30 volumes. It is written in medium large script in black ink, with use of red for the word "hadsana" (حَدَّثَنَا). The headings are in a larger black script. It consists of 112 pages, 111 lines per page written on light cream glazed paper, with vertical chain lines (grouped by two and three) and laid lines visible. The Text is vocalized throughout. It was copied in Aleppo by Jaʻfar ibn Ismaʻīl ibn Aḥmad al-shahīr bi-Ibn Zafrah on 14 Dhu al-Hijjah 791 AH (12 December 1389 CE). A digital version of this manuscript is available online.

=== Manuscript of Sahih Bukhari ===
This is a Manuscript of Sahih Bukhari located in National Library of Israel. It contains part 11 of 30 parts the book is divided into. It dates to 1388-1397 CE (790-800 AH), compromising of 71 pages (16 × 21 cm). A digital version of this manuscript is available online.

=== Khuda Baksh Library No. 141 ===
This is a copy of Sahih Bukhari written by the scribe "Ali bin Muhammad bin Ahmed bin Yousuf bin Ishmael". He completed copying this in the year 792 AH (1390 CE).

=== Khuda Baksh Library No. 149 ===
This is a 105 folio manuscript of Sahih Bukhari written in good naskh script. On the title page, a waqf nama is written which states that Fakhraddin, a Vizier of Egypt, donated this manuscript for public use in Jumada al-Awwal 817 AH (July/August 1414 CE) to Damascus. While it has not been Carbon dated yet, apparently it was made in 14th Century CE.

=== Manuscript of Sahih Bukhari ===
This is a manuscript of Sahih Bukhari copied around 795-796 AH (1392-1393 CE) located in National Library of Israel. It contains parts: 16, 18 and 23-30 of the original 60 parts that this work was divided into. It is very neatly copied, decorated and illuminated in Timurid style, on fine Iranian/Baghdadi papers; all ruled on 15 lines bound in mended Mamlūk bindings, probably later. It was made in either Baghdad or Shiraz. It was Heard and approved by Majd al-Dīn Muḥammad bin Yaʿqūb al-Fīrūzābādī (d. 817/1414).

=== King Saud University No. 1398 ===
This partial manuscript of Sahih Bukhari was written in 796 AH (1393 CE) using naskh script. It consists of 35 pages (26 by 18 cm). A digital version of this manuscript is available online.

=== Princeton University Garrett no. 213L ===
This is a 15 folio manuscript of the original 30th folio manuscript of sahih Bukhari. However the folios are misplaced with no proper order. According to the title page, the first folio is a copy of the twenty-first part of Bukhari. In the colophon, one volume is said to be the 20th part, and announces for the next volume the text at the beginning of this one. It consists of 133 pages (21.5 by 15.5 cm), 13 lines per page. A couple of folios seem to partially eaten by animals. This copy was completed by Talhah on Saturday 14 Dhu al-Qadah 809 AH (22 April 1407 CE). A digital version of this manuscript is available online.

=== King Saud University No. 4741 ===
This is a complete copy of Sahih Muslim which was written in the year 812 AH (1409 CE). It consists of 274 pages (20 by 15 cm). A digital version of this manuscript is available online.

=== Khuda Baksh Library No. 142 ===
This copy of Sahih Bukhari was written by the scribe "Musa bin hussain" with an Ijazah leading to Bukhari. The scribe may have been a descendent of fourth Caliph Ali, who lived from 762-840 AH (1360-1436 CE). He finished copying this in the year 832 AH (1428 CE).

=== Khuda Baksh Library No. 143 ===
This copy is a continuation of the previous copy, written by the same scribe and bearing the same Ijazah.

=== Princeton University Garrett no. 1904Yq ===
This is a manuscript of Sahih Bukhari. It has a long selling statement dated 19 Jumada al-Awwal 823 AH (1 June 1420 CE). Although it is not carbon dated yet, apparently it was made in the early 15th century. It consists of 302 pages (29 by 22 cm), 23 lines per page. It is written in medium large naskh script in black ink with occasional use of red on Biscuit paper with laid lines still visible and a few Marginal annotations. A digital version of this manuscript is available online.

=== Princeton University Library Garrett No. 689H ===
This is the ninth volume copy of Sahih Bukhari written in 15th century CE, consisting of 125 Pages (27.2 by 18.2 cm), 19 lines per page. It is Rubricated with full vowel signs and heavily stained with dampness. It contains a few marginal notes and glosses. A digital version of this manuscript is available online.

=== Princeton University Garrett no. 746Y ===
This is a manuscript of the seventh part of Sahih Bukhari. It consists of 219 pages (26 by 17 cm), 13 lines per page. It is written in medium large naskh script in black ink with use of red for headings and keywords. The title page is Illuminated in gold, blue and white. It contains a few marginal annotations and catchword on the verso of each leaf. Apparently it was made in 15th Century CE. A digital version of this manuscript is available online.
