= Seal of the Prophets =

Title used in the Qur'an and by Muslims for Muhammad

Seal of the Prophets (Arabic: خاتم النبيين, romanized: khātam an-nabīyīn or khātim an-nabīyīn; or خاتم الأنبياء, khātam al-anbiyā’ or khātim al-anbiyā) is a title used in the Qur'an and by Muslims to designate the Islamic prophet Muhammad as the last of the prophets sent by God.

The title is applied to Muhammad in verse 33:40 of the Qur'an, with the popular Yusuf Ali translation reading:

Muhammad is not the father of any of your men, but (he is) the Messenger of Allah, and the Seal of the Prophets: and Allah has full knowledge of all things.

— Qur'an 33:40

== Term variations ==
There is a difference among the schools of Qur'anic recitation regarding the reading of the word خاتم in verse 33:40 – it can be read as either khātim or khātam. Of the ten qirā’āt (readings, methods of recitation) regarded as authentic – seven mutawātir and three mashhūr – all read خاتم in this verse with a kasrah on the tāʼ (خاتِم, khātim) with the exception of 'Asim, who reads with a fatḥah on the tāʼ (خاتَم, khātam). The reading of al-Hasan, a shadhdh (aberrant) recitation, is also khātam.

The recitation that has become prevalent in most of the world today is Hafs 'an 'Asim – that is, the qirā’ah of 'Asim in the riwāyah (transmission) of his student Hafs.

== Hadith ==
=== Final brick metaphor ===
In a well-known hadith reported by Abu Hurayrah, Jabir ibn Abd Allah, Ubayy ibn Ka'b, and Abu Sa‘id al-Khudri, and recorded by al-Bukhari, Muslim ibn al-Hajjaj, al-Tirmidhi, Ahmad ibn Hanbal, al-Nasa'i, and others, Muhammad compared the relationship between himself and the previous prophets to a building missing a single brick. In Sahih al-Bukhari it is reported by Abu Hurayrah that Muhammad said, "My similitude in comparison with the prophets before me is that of a man who has built a house nicely and beautifully, except for a place of one brick in a corner. The people go about it and wonder at its beauty, but say: 'Would that this brick be put in its place!' So I am that brick, and I am the seal of the prophets" (fa’anā ’l-labinah, wa anā khātamu ’n-nabīyīn). This hadith is narrated with similar wording in Sahih Muslim, Musnad Ahmad ibn Hanbal, as-Sunan al-Kubra of al-Nasa'i, and Sahih Ibn Hibban. In Mu'jam al-Awsat, al-Tabarani narrated a variant wording of the hadith with the last statement being, "So I am that [brick], I am the seal of the prophets, there is no prophet after me" (fa’anā dhālika, anā khātamu ’n-nabīyīn, lā nabīya ba‘dī). Ibn Hibban also has a variant ending with "I was the place of that brick, with me the [line of] messengers is sealed" (fakuntu anā mawḍi‘u tilka ’l-labinah, khutima biya ’r-rusul). In Sahih Muslim and Musnad Ahmad the hadith is also reported by Jabir ibn Abd Allah, with the last statement being "So I am the place of that brick, I have come and sealed the [line of] prophets" (fa’anā mawḍi‘u ’l-labinah, ji’tu fakhatamtu ’l-anbiyā’). Abu Dawud al-Tayalisi in his Musnad has from Jabir, "So I am the place of that brick, with me the [line of] prophets is sealed" (fa’anā mawḍi‘u ’l-labinah, khutima biya ’l-anbiyā’).

=== Other hadith ===
In another hadith, Muhammad prophesied the appearance of a number of false prophets before the day of judgement, while asserting his status as the seal of the prophets. It is reported by Thawban ibn Kaidad that Muhammad said, "The Hour will not be established until tribes of my ummah (community) unite with the idolaters, and until they worship idols. And in my ummah there will be thirty liars, each of whom will claim to be a prophet, (but) I am the seal of the prophets, there is no prophet after me." Hudhayfah ibn al-Yaman reports that Muhammad said, "In my ummah there will be twenty-seven liars and dajjals, among whom are four women, (but) I am the seal of the prophets, there is no prophet after me".

== Classical lexicons ==
According to the authoritative dictionary Lisan al-Arab of Ibn Manzur,

The khitām of a group of people, the khātim of them, or the khātam of them, is the last of them, according to al-Lihyani. And Muhammad is khātim of the prophets. At-Tahdhib (of al-Azhari): Khātim and khātam are among the names of the Prophet. And in the Qur'an: "Muhammad is not the father of any of your men, but he is the Messenger of Allah and khātim of the prophets," that is, the last of them. And: It was also recited as khātam. And the saying of al-'Ajjaj, "Blessed to the prophets is this khātim," is based on the well-known recitation, with a kasrah (khātim). And also among his names is al-‘āqib, and its meaning is "last of the prophets."

According to Taj al-Arus of al-Zabidi,

Khātam: The last of a people, like khātim. And with this definition is the saying in the Qur'an, "khātam of the prophets," that is, the last of them.

Further,

And among the names of the Prophet are khātam and khātim, and he is the one who sealed prophethood by his coming.

== Traditional interpretation ==
The title is generally regarded by Muslims as meaning that Muhammad is the last in the series of prophets beginning with Adam. The belief that a new prophet cannot arise after Muhammad is shared by both Sunni and Shi'a Muslims. Some of the most prominent historical Sunni texts on creed (aqidah) explicitly mention the doctrine of finality of prophethood. For example, in al-Aqidah at-Tahawiyyah it is asserted that "Every claim to the prophetic office after his is a delusion and a wandering desire." In another popular work, al-Aqidah an-Nasafiyyah, it is stated, "The first of the prophets is Adam and the last is Muhammad."

== Western Orientalists views ==
Hartwig Hirschfeld doubted the authenticity of the verse 33:40 and claimed it to be of late origin. Yohanan Friedmann states that Hirschfeld's arguments "that the title khatam an-nabiyyin is unusual, that it only appears once in the Qur'an, that the word khatam is not Arabic…do not seem valid arguments against the authenticity of the verse."

Frants Buhl accepted the traditional meaning of last prophet.

Josef Horovitz suggested two possible interpretations of khatam an-nabiyyin: the last prophet or the one who confirms the authenticity of the previous prophets. Heinrich Speyer agreed with Horovitz.

According to Alford T. Welch, the traditional Muslim belief that Muhammad is "last and greatest of the prophets" is most likely based on a later interpretation of 33:40.

The first modern academic to have studied in detail the history of the doctrine of finality of prophethood is Yohanan Friedmann. In his seminal article, Finality of Prophethood in Sunni Islam (1986), he concluded that although the notion of finality of prophethood "eventually acquired an undisputed and central place in the religious thought of Islam," it was contested during the first century AH. He states, "While it is true that the phrase khatam an-nabiyyin is generally interpreted as meaning 'the last prophet', the exegetical tradition and other branches of classical Arabic literature preserved material which indicates that this now generally received understanding of the Qur'anic phrase is not the only possible one and had not necessarily been the earliest." Due to this Friedmann states that the meaning of khatam an-nabiyyin in its original Qur'anic context is still in doubt.

Wilferd Madelung takes Friedmann's findings into consideration in observing that the original Qur'anic meaning of the term is not entirely certain. However, in a more recent paper he states, "Most Muslims at the time no doubt understood it to mean that he was to be the last prophet and Islam was the final religion, as Muslims have commonly understood it ever since."

Carl W. Ernst considers the phrase to mean that Muhammad's "imprint on history is as final as a wax seal on a letter."

David Powers, also making use of Friedmann's research, believes that the early Muslim community was divided over the meaning of the expression, with some understanding it to mean he fulfilled or confirmed the earlier Christian and Jewish revelations, while others understood it as signifying that Muhammad brought the office of prophethood to a close. He suggests that the Qur'anic text underwent a series of secondary omissions and additions which were designed to adapt the text to the dogma of finality of prophethood, and that the idea of finality only became the prevailing interpretation (alongside the notion of confirmation or fulfilment) by the end of the 1st century AH / 7th century. In a review of Powers' book, Gerald Hawting goes further, suggesting that the development of the doctrine was not complete before the 3rd century AH / 9th century. Madelung comments that Power's argument, that verses 36–40 are a later addition dating from the generation after Muhammad's death, is "hardly sustainable."

Uri Rubin holds that the finality of prophethood is a Qur'anic idea, not a post-Qur'anic one, and that the expression khatam an-nabiyyin implies both finality of prophethood and confirmation. In response to Powers and other modern scholars sceptical of the early origin of the doctrine, Rubin concludes from his study "that, at least as far as Sura 33 is concerned, the consonantal structure of the Qur'anic text has not been tampered with, and that the idea of finality of prophethood is well-represented in the text, as well as in the earliest available extra-Quranic materials." Rubin reexamines the early extra-Qur'anic texts cited by Friedmann and other modern scholars, and concludes that rather than indicating that the notion of finality of prophethood is late, the texts confirm the early origin of the belief. He concludes that "there is no compelling reason to assume that the Muslims of the first Islamic century originally understood the Qur'anic khatam an-nabiyyin in the sense of confirmation alone, without that of finality."

== Official mandates ==
In Pakistan voters before voting and leaders before assuming their offices have to declare in writing and take an oath of finality of prophethood, (i.e. Khatm-i-Nabuwat); any one not subscribing is considered claiming otherwise and a non-Muslim and may face persecution and loss of opportunities. Quranic verses and Ahadith pertaining to the finality of prophethood have to be displayed prominently in Government offices, and at entrances to districts along highways.

On 22 June 2020, the Government of Pakistan made it mandatory that the term (Urdu: خاتم انبیین, romanized: k͟hātam-un-nabiyīn) be added to the name of Muhammad in textbooks and official documents where previously it was passed on 15 June in the Sindh Assembly. In October 2021 Punjab, Pakistan provincial assembly recommended inclusion of oath of Khatm-i-Nabuwat in the Nikah (marriage) documents.

Similarly, the Khatumo administration based in Buuhoodle and centred on the Sool, central Sanaag and Ayn regions of northern Somalia, claims its title is derived from the Quranic injunction of Khatam an-Nabiyyin.

== Ahmadi interpretation ==
The Ahmadiyya Community believe that Muhammad brought prophethood to perfection and was the last prophet to have brought a complete and comprehensive universal law for humanity, but prophethood subordinate to Muhammad is still open. New prophets may be born, but they must be seen as subordinate to Muhammad and cannot create any new law or religion. Mirza Ghulam Ahmad, who founded the movement in Qadian, India in 1889, is believed to be the promised Messiah and Mahdi. He claimed a kind of prophethood, believed he had been divinely appointed to revive and universally establish Islam, but not to have add to or change the laws of God or Muhammad. This has caused dispute between Ahmadis and mainstream Muslims, who accuse them of denying the finality of prophethood and therefore consider them to be outside the Islamic fold. Ahmadiyya community members are subjected to considerable persecution for their beliefs in some countries.

== Baháʼí Faith view ==
The Baháʼí Faith regards Muhammad as a Manifestation of God and as the Seal of the Prophets, but does not believe Revelation or Scripture from God has ended. In particular, Baháʼís regard the end-times prophecies of Islam (and other faiths) as being both metaphorical and literal, and see the Báb and Bahá'u'lláh as fulfilling these prophetic expectations. The latter of these is the founder of the Baháʼí religion, which considers Islamic law as secondary or tertiary to its own. Muhammad is seen as ending the Adamic cycle, also known as the Prophetic cycle, which is stated by Bahá'is to have begun approximately 6,000 years ago, and the Báb and Bahá'u'lláh as starting the Baháʼí cycle, or Cycle of Fulfilment, which will last at least five hundred thousand years with numerous Manifestations of God appearing throughout this time. Moreover, Mirza Husayn 'Ali Nuri Bahá'u'lláh gave the Title "King of the Messengers" (sultán al-rusul) to the Báb, and the "Sender of the Messengers" (mursil al-rusul) to himself. Additionally, the Kitáb-i-Íqán shows the Islamic concept of the oneness of the prophets and the Hadith, "knowledge is a single point, which the foolish have multiplied," to reveal that the term "Seal of the Prophets", like Alpha and Omega, apply to all the prophets: "Whilst established upon the seat of the 'first', they occupy the throne of the 'last'." In summary, these interpretive and legal differences have caused the Bahá'ís to be seen as heretics and apostates by some Muslims, which has led to their persecution in different countries.
