= Abu Dawud =

Abu Dawud is a common Arabic name which may refer to:

- Abu Dawud al-Tayalisi (c. 750 – 820), early Muslim hadith collector
- Abu Dawud al-Sijistani (817/18 – 889), author of the Sunan Abu Dawud, one of the six canonical hadith collections in Sunni Islam
- Abu Dawud (ISN 31) (born 1977), Guantanamo captive (Mahmoud Abd Al Aziz Abd Al Mujahid)
- Abu Daoud (1937–2010)
