= Last prophet =

Last person through whom God speaks

The last prophet, or final prophet, is a term used in religious contexts, especially in the Abrahamic religions, to refer to the last person through whom God speaks, after which there is to be no other. The appellation also refers to the prophet who will induce humankind to turn back to God. In Islam the term is designated to the Islamic prophet Muhammad.

== Abrahamic and ancient Near Eastern religions ==
=== Judaism ===
Judaism considers Malachi to be the last of the biblical prophets.

=== Christianity ===
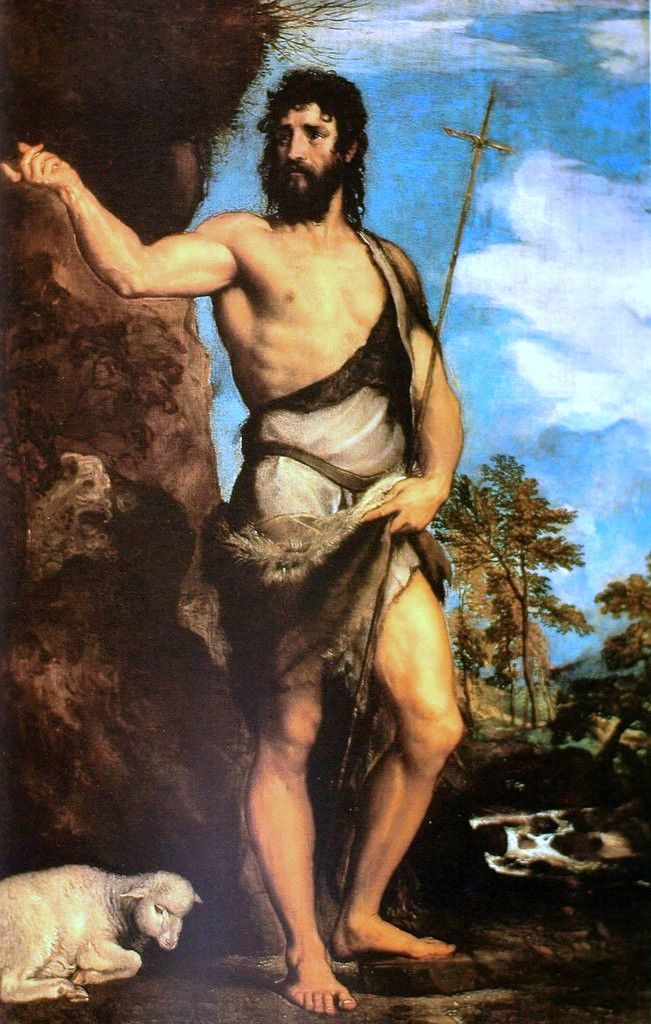
John the Baptist is the last prophet of the Old Covenant.

In Christianity, the last prophet of the Old Covenant before the arrival of Jesus is John the Baptist (cf. Luke 16:16). The Eastern Orthodox Church holds that Malachi was the "Seal of Prophets" in the Old Testament. Christian denominations who hold that spiritual gifts (including prophecy) continue to be bestowed by the Holy Spirit on Christians are known as "continuationists" (including Catholics, Methodists, and Pentecostals), while the cessationist perspective, which teaches that charismata ended in the Apostolic era, is held by much of Reformed Christianity and Baptists. The book of Revelation in the very last days during the Tribulation period states that two prophets, (many believe one to be Elijah because of the book of Malachi stating his return at the end), will return to earth and inform the world of what's happening and pour out some of God's judgments.

=== Mandaeism ===
In Mandaeism, John the Baptist is the greatest and final prophet.

=== Manichaeism ===
In Manichaeism, the founder Mani is believed by adherents of the faith to be the last and final prophet after a long succession of religious figures, including Zoroaster, the Gautama Buddha and Jesus Christ. According to Al-Biruni, a 10th-century Iranian scholar, Mani claimed to be the Paraclete promised in the New Testament and the Last Prophet.

=== Islam ===
The phrase Khatamu ’n-Nabiyyīn ("Seal of the Prophets") is a title used in the Quran to designate the Islamic prophet Muhammad. It is generally regarded and believed to mean that Muhammad is the last of the prophets sent by God.

== Indian religions ==
=== Hinduism ===
In Hinduism, the history of mankind is described in four religious (dharmic) ages (yugas), which depict a gradual decline in religious activities, only to be renewed at the end to start a new cycle of the four ages. At the end of the Kali Yuga, the current and last age in a cycle, Kalki, the tenth avatar of Vishnu, is prophesied to appear to punish the wicked, reward the good, and inaugurate the Satya Yuga of the next cycle. Kalki is the last avatar in the current cycle.
