= Jami (name) =

Jami may refer to the following people:

Given name

- Jami Attenberg (born 1971), American author
- Jami Bernard (born 1956), American author and media consultant
- Jami Deadly (born 1979), American actress, glamour model, singer and burlesque dancer
- Jami Floyd (born 1964) American attorney
- Jami Gertz (born 1965), American actress
- Jami Gong, Chinese-American stand-up comedian
- Jami Kranich (born 1992), American footballer
- Jami Puustinen (born 1987), Finnish footballer
- Jami Rafati (born 1994), Italian footballer
- Jami Reid-Quarrell (born 1978), Scottish actor
- Jami Rogers-Anderson (born 1970), American soprano opera singer
- Jami-Lee Ross (born 1985), New Zealand politician
- Jami Smith, American singer

Nickname

Surname

- A. H. Jami (1953–2020), Indian cartoonist
- Catherine Jami (born 1961), French historian of Chinese mathematics
- Ehsan Jami (born 1985), Dutch politician
- Mehdi Jami (born 1961), Iranian journalist
- Segundo Jami (born 1986), Ecuadorian runner
- Sheikh Ahmad-e Jami (1048–1141), a Persian writer, mystic and poet
