= Jami (disambiguation) =

Jami was a 15th-century Persian poet.

Jami or JAMI may also refer to:

- Jami (name)
- Jami (software), a distributed multimedia communications platform
- Jami, Vizianagaram, a village in Andhra Pradesh, India
- Jami, Iran, a village in North Khorasan Province, Iran
- Jomi District, in Tajikistan
- Islamic Front for the Iraqi Resistance (al-Jabha el-Islamiya lil-Moqawama al-Iraqiya, or JAMI), a former Sunni Muslim insurgent group in Iraq
- Jamshed Mahmood Raza, Pakistani film director
- Al-Jāmiʿ (Arabic: الجامع), one of the names of God in Islam, meaning "Unifier" or "Gatherer"
- Samuel ben Jacob ibn Jami
