= Abdallah ibn Abi al-Shawarib =

Abbasid Chief Qadi (qadi al-qudat) from 961 to 963

Abdallah ibn Abi al-Shawarib عبد الله بن أبي الشوارب

Abbasid Chief Judge
- In office September/October 961 – June 963; Caliph: Al-Muti
- Succeeded by: Umar ibn Aktham

Personal life
- Born: November/December c. 931
- Died: 1025/1027
- Parent: Al-Hasan ibn Abdallah
- Era: Islamic Golden Age
- Region: Baghdad, Iraq
- Main interest(s): Islamic theology, Tawhid, Islamic jurisprudence

Religious life
- Religion: Islam
- Creed: Sunni (Hanafi)

Abdallah ibn al-Hasan ibn Abdallah ibn Ali ibn Muhammad ibn Abd al-Malik ibn Abi'l-Shawarib (Arabic: عبدالله بن الحسن بن أبي الشوارب) was a 10th-century Muslim jurist who served as chief qadi of Baghdad.

Born in November/December 931, Abdallah belonged to the Banu Abi'l-Shawarib family, a Hanafi legal family that in the 9th and 11th centuries produced 24 qadis, including eight chief qadis, for the Abbasid caliphs. His brother Muhammad served as chief qadi in 944–945 and 946–947.

He became chief qadi in September/October 961, after purchasing the office from the ruling Buyids against a yearly payment of 200,000 silver dirham. To pay for this, he in turn sold appointments to the shurta and hisbah for 20,000 dirham per lunar month. This met with the opposition of Caliph al-Muti, who refused to confirm him in his office or even meet him. It was the Buyid ruler, Mu'izz al-Dawla, who performed the investiture instead. The appointment was broadly opposed, both by the populace and by scholarly opinion, and he was deposed after less than two years in office, in June 963. He was replaced by his immediate predecessor, Umar ibn Aktham, and all his judgements were pronounced void.

The modern historian Heribert Busse regards the episode as "possibly the crassest example of venality" of the entire period, and remarks that the medieval historian al-Khatib al-Baghdadi did not deign to include a biography of Abdallah in his biographical dictionary on the history of Baghdad. Abdallah died sometime in 1025–1027.

== Sources ==
- Busse, Heribert (2004) [1969]. Chalif und Grosskönig - Die Buyiden im Irak (945–1055) [Caliph and Great King – The Buyids in Iraq (945–1055)] (in German). Würzburg: Ergon Verlag. ISBN 3-89913-005-7.
