= Muhammad ibn Salih al-Hashimi =

Abbasid chief Qadi (qadi al-qudat) from 973/4 to 975

Muhammad ibn Salih al-Hashimi محمد بن صالح الهاشمي

Abbasid Chief Judge
- In office 973/4 – 975; Caliphs: al-Muti and al-Ta'i
- Preceded by: Abu Muhammad Ubaydallah ibn Ahmad ibn Ma'ruf
- Succeeded by: Abu Muhammad Ubaydallah ibn Ahmad ibn Ma'ruf

Personal life
- Born: 905/6; Kufa
- Died: November/December 979; Baghdad
- Spouse: Bint Muhammad
- Parent: Salih al-Abbasi al-Hashimi
- Era: Islamic Golden Age
- Region: Baghdad, Iraq
- Main interest(s): Islamic theology, Tawhid, Islamic jurisprudence

Religious life
- Religion: Islam
- Creed: Sunni

Abu'l-Husayn Muhammad ibn Salih ibn Umm Shayban al-Hashimi (أبو الحسين محمد بن صالح بن أم شيبان الهاشمي) was a member of the extended Abbasid dynasty who became chief qadi in Iraq in 973/4–975, under the Buyid emir.

== Life ==
Muhammad ibn Salih was born in Kufa in 905/6. He came to Baghdad in 928/9, and married a daughter of the chief qadi Abu Umar Muhammad.

He became a qadi himself in Baghdad, first over the City of al-Mansur, then in January/February 947, over all of West Baghdad. Replaced in October/November 947, he was appointed qadi of Egypt, Palestine, and parts of Syria.

In 973/4 he was appointed chief qadi in Baghdad, succeeding Ibn Ma'ruf, until he was dismissed in May/June 975. He died in November/December 979.

== Sources ==
- Busse, Heribert (2004) [1969]. Chalif und Grosskönig - Die Buyiden im Irak (945-1055) [Caliph and Great King - The Buyids in Iraq (945-1055)] (in German). Würzburg: Ergon Verlag. ISBN 3-89913-005-7.
