= Shuraih Al-Qadhi =

7th-century Judge (Qadi) of Kufa in the Caliphate

Shuraih Al-Qadhi Shurayḥ ibn al-Ḥārith شريح ابن الحارث

Qadi of Kufa
- In office 640s–697

Personal life
- Born: Shuraih Yemen
- Died: c. 697 Iraq
- Children: Ibn Ḥarith
- Parent: Ḥarith al-Kindī
- Era: Caliphate era
- Region: Rashidun Caliphate, Umayyad Caliphate
- Main interest(s): Islamic theology, Islamic jurisprudence
- Known for: One of the longest serving Judge of Kufa during early Islamic era.

Religious life
- Religion: Islam

Shurayḥ ibn al-Ḥārith (شريح ابن الحارث) ibn Qays ibn al-Jahm al-Kindî īd. June 697/~80 Hijri) was a tābi‘ ( singular of Tabi'un ) who converted to Islam in Yemen during the lifetime of Muhammad though he never met him. During the reign of Umar al-Farooq, he relocated to Kufah in Iraq. He served as a qadi (judge).

During the Caliphate of Umar, he appointed Abu al-Darda to the judiciary in Medina and subsequently in Damascus, Salman ibn Rabi'a in Al-Qādisiyyah and subsequently in Al-Mada'in, Shurayh ibn al-Harith in Kufa, Abu Musa al-Ash'ari in Basra, and Ka'b ibn Yasar ibn Danna, followed by Qays ibn al-As, in Egypt. Therefore, the judicial system remained relatively uncomplicated during the era of Rashidun Caliphate.

A well-known historical anecdote involving caliph Ali ibn Abī Ṭālib and Qāḍī Shurayḥ ibn al-Ḥārith al-Kindī illustrates early Islamic judicial principles. According to classical sources, Alī brought a legal case concerning a shield claimed to belong to him, which was in the possession of a Jewish man in Kūfah.

Qāḍī Shurayḥ, serving as judge at the time, requested proof from the claimant. Ali presented his son al-Ḥasan as his witness. Qāḍī Shurayḥ ruled that the son’s testimony was not admissible due to the close familial relationship, and with no other evidence, the case was decided in favor of the defendant. The Jewish man, impressed by the fairness of the ruling, reportedly returned the shield and admitted the shield did indeed belong to Ali and he accepted Islam. Ali then gifted the shield to the man.

This story is cited in early Islamic legal texts, including Abū Yūsuf’s Kitāb al-Kharāj, and is often used to demonstrate the principle that even the ruler is subject to the law and that judicial decisions are independent of political authority. Sources do not indicate any coercion or improper influence in Shurayḥ’s ruling.

The anecdote is considered a classical example of judicial impartiality in early Islam, and it has been referenced in both Sunni and Shiʿi historical discussions of law and governance.
