= Mamluk (disambiguation) =

Mamluk is a social institution in the Islamic world before the nineteenth century.

Mamluk, Mameluke, or Mamaluke may refer to:

== Mamluk states and culture ==
- Mamluk Sultanate, a state that ruled Egypt and Syria from the 13th through the early 16th centuries
- Mamluk dynasty (Delhi), a state in northern India in the 13th century
- Mamluk dynasty (Iraq) in the 18th and 19th centuries
- Mamluk-Kipchak language
- Mamluk architecture
- Mamluk carpets
- Mamluk playing cards

== Other ==
- Mameluke (American horse) (foaled 1948), an American racehorse
- Mameluke (British horse) (1824–1849), a British racehorse
- Mameluke sword, used by the United States Marine Corps and formerly by the British Army
- Mamelukes of the Imperial Guard, a cavalry unit of Napoleon's Imperial Guard
- Mamluk Ali Nanautawi (1789–1851), Indian Muslim scholar
- The Mamalukes, a professional wrestling tag team
- Tony Mamaluke (born 1977), the ring name of American professional wrestler Charles Spencer
