= Abu Muhammad Ubaydallah ibn Ahmad ibn Ma'ruf =

10th-century Chief Qadi (qadi al-qudat) of Baghdad

Abu Muhammad Ubaydallah ibn Ahmad ibn Ma'ruf أبو محمد عبيد الله بن أحمد بن معروف

Chief Judge of Baghdad, Iraq
- In office 18 July 967 – 970; Caliph: al-Muti
- In office 971 – 973/4; Caliph: al-Muti
- Succeeded by: Muhammad ibn Salih al-Hashimi

Chief Judge of Baghdad
- In office 975 – 23 August 979; Caliph: al-Ta'i
- Preceded by: Muhammad ibn Salih al-Hashimi
- Succeeded by: None (post vacant)

Chief Judge of Baghdad
- In office 987 – 25 April 991; Caliph: al-Ta'i

Personal life
- Died: 25 April 991; Baghdad
- Parent: Ahmad ibn Ma'ruf
- Era: Islamic Golden Age
- Region: Baghdad, Iraq
- Main interest(s): Islamic theology, Islamic jurisprudence, Mu'tazilite creed

Religious life
- Religion: Islam
- Creed: Mu'tazilite (Sunni)

Abu Muhammad Ubaydallah ibn Ahmad ibn Ma'ruf (أبو محمد عبيد الله بن أحمد بن معروف) also known as Ubaydallah ibn Ahmad or simply as ibn Ma'ruf was thrice chief qadi in Iraq for the Abbasid caliphs under the Buyid Emirs.

== Life ==
A Mu'tazilite, Ibn Ma'ruf was a prominent member of the cultural circle around the vizier Abu Muhammad al-Hasan al-Muhallabi (950/1–963).

On 18 July 967, Ibn Ma'ruf was appointed as qadi of West Baghdad, the City of al-Mansur, and of the caliphal palaces. Abu Bakr Ahmad ibn Sayyar was his colleague as qadi of the rest of East Baghdad except for March 968–January 970, when Ibn Sayyar took over responsibility for the entirety of East Baghdad.

Ibn Ma'ruf was appointed chief qadi of Iraq in June 971 and held the office until he resigned in 973/4 in protest at the interference of the Buyid emirs in the administration of justice. His successor, Muhammad ibn Salih al-Hashimi, was deposed in May/June 975, and Ibn Ma'ruf was restored to the office of chief qadi. Caliph al-Ta'i (r. 974–991) offered Ibn Ma'ruf the position of caliphal secretary (katib), but Ibn Ma'ruf refused.

He was dismissed and exiled to Fars by the Buyid ruler Adud al-Dawla on 23 August 979, along with other members of the Baghdad establishment close to the caliph. The position of chief qadi in Baghdad was abolished altogether, and the judicial administration of Iraq handed over to the chief qadi of Shiraz. Iraq was thus effectively reduced to a regular province of the Buyid empire, governed from a new imperial centre.

Although Ibn Ma'ruf was released from captivity by Adud al-Dawla's successor, Sharaf al-Dawla, in 983, no chief qadi was appointed in Baghdad until Ibn Ma'ruf's return in 987, when he resumed his position and held it until his death on 25 April 991.

== Sources ==
- Busse, Heribert (2004) [1969]. Chalif und Grosskönig - Die Buyiden im Irak (945-1055) [Caliph and Great King - The Buyids in Iraq (945-1055)] (in German). Würzburg: Ergon Verlag. ISBN 3-89913-005-7.
