= Jami Rafati =

Italian footballer

Personal information
- Full name: Jami Rafati
- Date of birth: 26 April 1994 (age 32)
- Place of birth: Florence, Italy
- Height: 1.70 m (5 ft 7 in)
- Position: Midfielder

Youth career
- 2011–2013: West Ham United
- 2013–2014: Genoa

Senior career*
| Years | Team | Apps | (Gls) |
| 2013–2014 | Genoa | 0 | (0) |
| 2014–2016 | Livorno | 1 | (0) |
| 2016–2017 | Messina | 0 | (0) |
| 2017–2018 | Pistoiese | 0 | (0) |
- * Club domestic league appearances and goals as of 21 October 2018

Jami Rafati (born 26 April 1994) is an Italian former professional footballer who played as a central midfielder.

== Club career ==
Rafati's professional career started after he signed a contract in 2011 with West Ham United. In the summer of 2013, he moved to Genoa being valued at €100,000. Jami Rafati made his debut in Serie A on 3 May 2014 playing from the start for Genoa against Sassuolo, and the match ended 0–0.

Rafati signed a contract on 7 July 2014 with newly relegated Serie B team Livorno until 2016.

On 12 November 2018, he was released from his contract with Pistoiese by mutual consent.

== International career ==
Because he was born in Italy but has an Iranian father, Jami Rafati is eligible to play for the national team of Italy or Iran. However, he has not yet been called up by either team and remains uncapped.
