= Musnad al-Tayalisi =

- Author: Abu Dawood Al-Tayalisi
- Original title: مسند أبي داود الطيالسي
- Language: Arabic
- Genre: Hadith collection

Musnad al-Tayalisi (Arabic: مسند الطيالسي, romanized: Musnad al-Ṭayālisī) is one of the oldest Hadith books written and compiled. It was compiled by Imam Abu Dawood al-Tayalisi (Sulaymān ibn Dāwūd, 133 H/750-1 CE? – Rabī` I 204 H/viii-ix.819 CE?).

== Description ==
The book contains almost three thousand (3000) hadiths according to Al-Maktaba Al-Shamela. It is one of the oldest Musnad ( a Hadith book with full isnāds, also organized by Companion) written. It is written in the second century of the Islamic Calendar and written before the most authentic book of Hadiths (narrations of Muhammad) that are Sahihain (Sahih al-Bukhari & Sahih Muslim). The Musnad (مسند) are collections of Hadiths which are classified by narrators, and therefore by Sahabas (companions of Muhammad). It seems that the collection is not directly the work of the Imam, but what his pupil Yunus ibn Habib assembled from what the Sheikh transmitted to him.

== Publications ==
The book has been published by many organizations around the world:

- Musnad Abi Dawud al-Tayalisi Commentary by Sulayman ibn Dawud Tayalisi: Published: abebooks | UK

== See also ==
- List of Sunni books
- Kutub al-Sittah
- Sahih Muslim
- Jami al-Tirmidhi
- Sunan Abu Dawood
- Jami' at-Tirmidhi
- Sunan ibn Majah
- Muwatta Malik
