= Abu Dawud al-Tayalisi =

Iraqi collector of hadith (750/751 – 819/820)

Abu Dawud al-Tayalisi أبو داود الطيالسي

Personal life
- Born: 133 AH (750/751 CE) Basra, Iraq
- Died: 204 AH (819/820 CE) Basra, Iraq
- Notable work: Musnad al-Tayalisi
- Occupation: Hadith scholar

Religious life
- Religion: Islam
- Denomination: Sunni

Abū Dāwūd Sulaymān ibn Dāwūd al-Ṭayālisī (Arabic: أبو داود سليمان بن داود الطيالسي; 750/751 – 819/820 CE) was a Muslim scholar and muhaddith (collector of hadiths) of the second century of Muslim calendar.

== Biography ==
Al-Tayalisi was born in 133 according to the Muslim calendar (the year 750 or 751 of the Common Era) in the city of Basra, Iraq. He completed his initial studies in local town and then moved to Baghdad for higher education where he was taught by great scholars of that time such as Hammad ibn Salama, Abu Awana and Muhammad ibn Abd al-Rahman. Al-Tayalisi was considered a highly reliable hadith reporter by all scholars of hadith. He traveled widely across many countries to collect hadiths of Muhammad to complete his book (Musnad al-Tayalisi). He died in 204 AH and was buried in Basra.

He is not to be confused with Abu Dawud al-Sijistani, who is the author of Sunan Abu Dawud, one of the six "canonical" hadith collections.

== His works ==
He wrote many books, but his famous book is Musnad al-Tayalisi.
