= Qasr al-'Ashiq =

Historic palace in Samarra, Iraq

- قصر العاشق (Arabic)
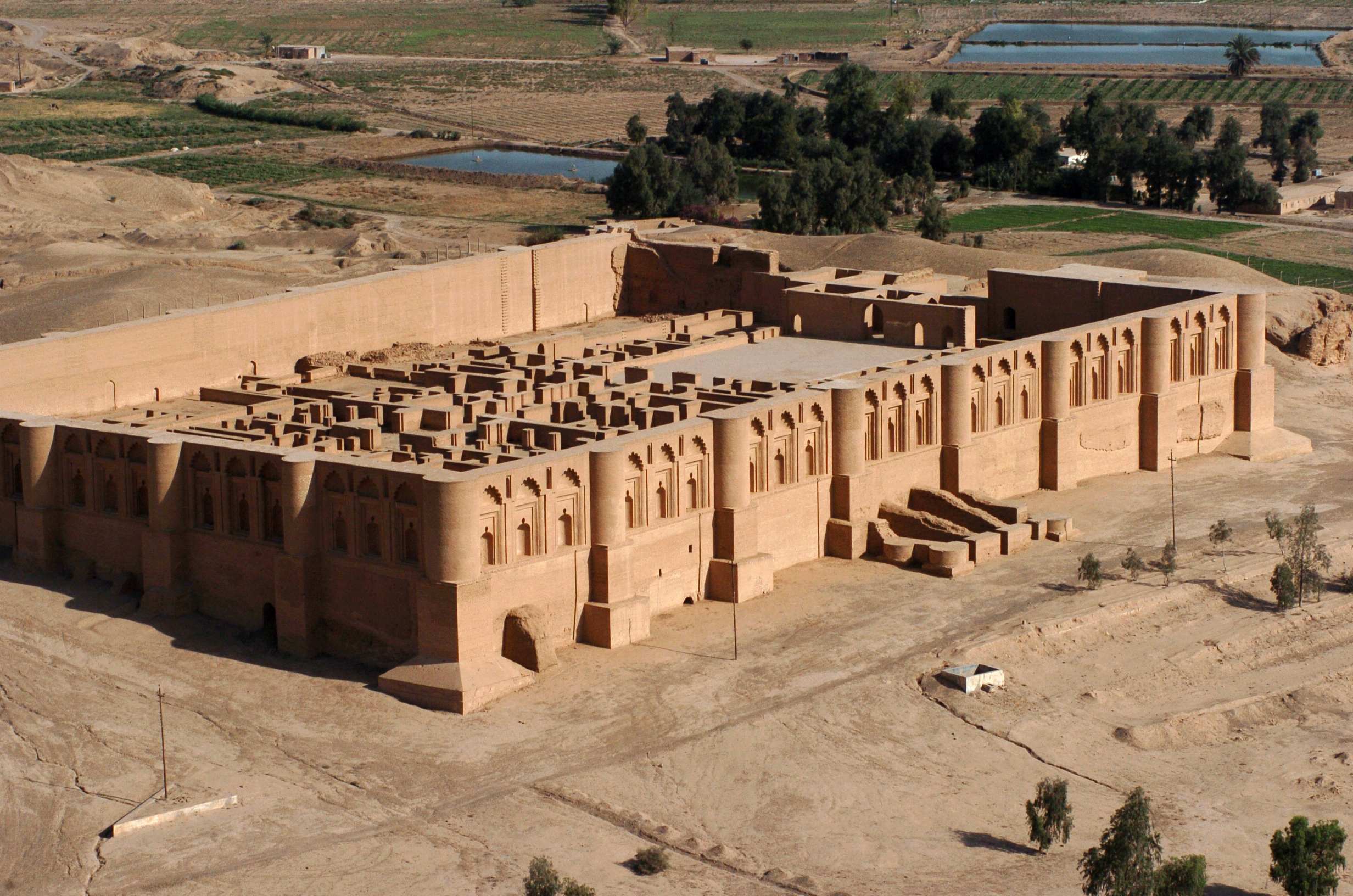
- Aerial view of Qasr al-'Ashiq

- Location within Iraq
- Interactive map of Qasr al-'Ashiq
- 34°14′29″N 43°48′32″E
- Location: Samarra, Iraq

History
- Built: 877–882

Site notes
- Architectural style: Abbasid

UNESCO World Heritage Site
- Type: Cultural
- Criteria: ii, iii, iv
- Designated: 2007
- Reference no.
- Region: Arab World

Qasr al-'Ashiq (Arabic: قصر العاشق, romanized: Qaṣr al-ʿāšiq) is a historical palace that dates back to the Abbasid era, located near the city of Samarra, Iraq.

== Location ==
It is situated at 16km west of the modern city of Samarra, on the western bank of the Tigris.

== History ==
The palace was commissioned under the 15th Abbasid caliph Al-Mu'tamid, and construction took place during 877–882. Accounts differ regarding the person who was assigned to construct this palace. Yaqut al-Hamawi mentions the name of Ali bin Yahi al-Munajam and Moez al-Dawla who initiated the groundbreaking. Emir 'Amad al-Dawla wrote a poem about this palace. During the medieval period, it was referred to as "al-Ma'shuq (Arabic: المعشوق)" which means "beloved". The palace was excavated in 1960s and restored during the 1980s.

== Architecture ==
Qasr al-'Ashiq is a prominent surviving example of the Abbasid architectural style palace. The building is rectangular shaped and consists of two floors, one of them used as catacombs and vaults. It is surrounded by large yards, which are surrounded by walls. Outside the walls is a long moat, in which water flows from the underground channel which begins from the western highlands. Surface of the moat is higher than the nearby river.

== Gallery ==
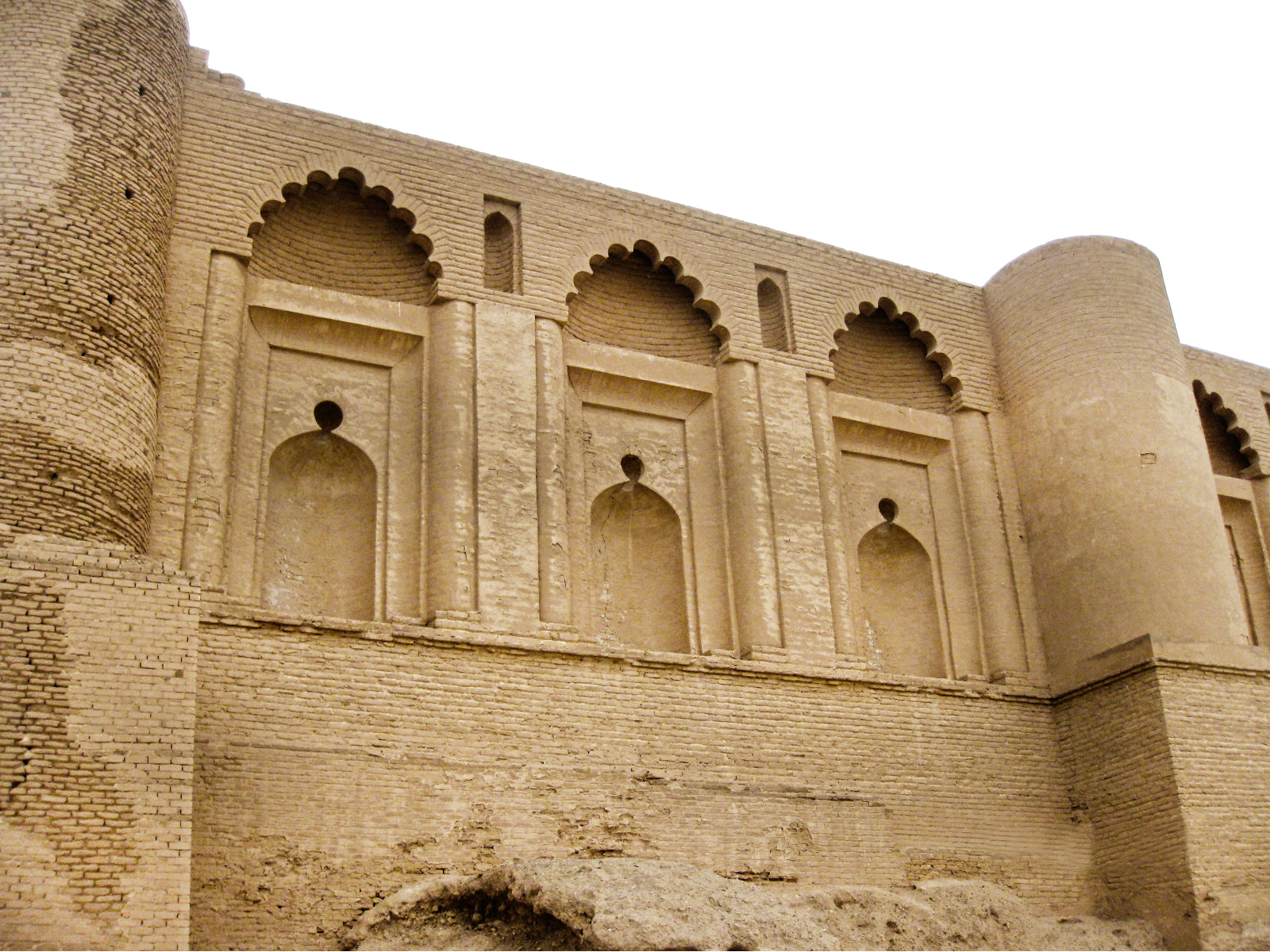
Multifoil arches on the façade

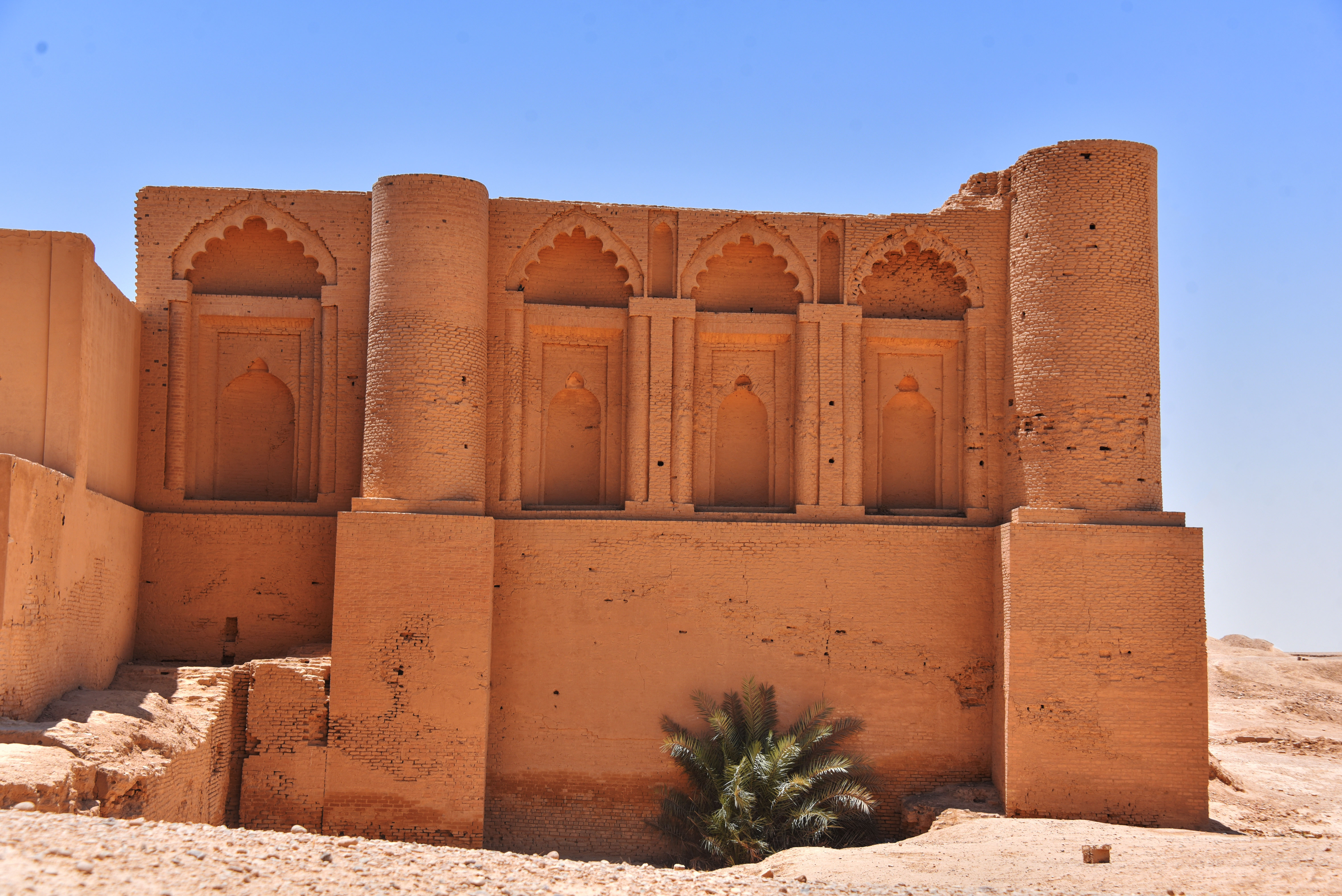
Multifoil arches combined with a pointed arch on the façade

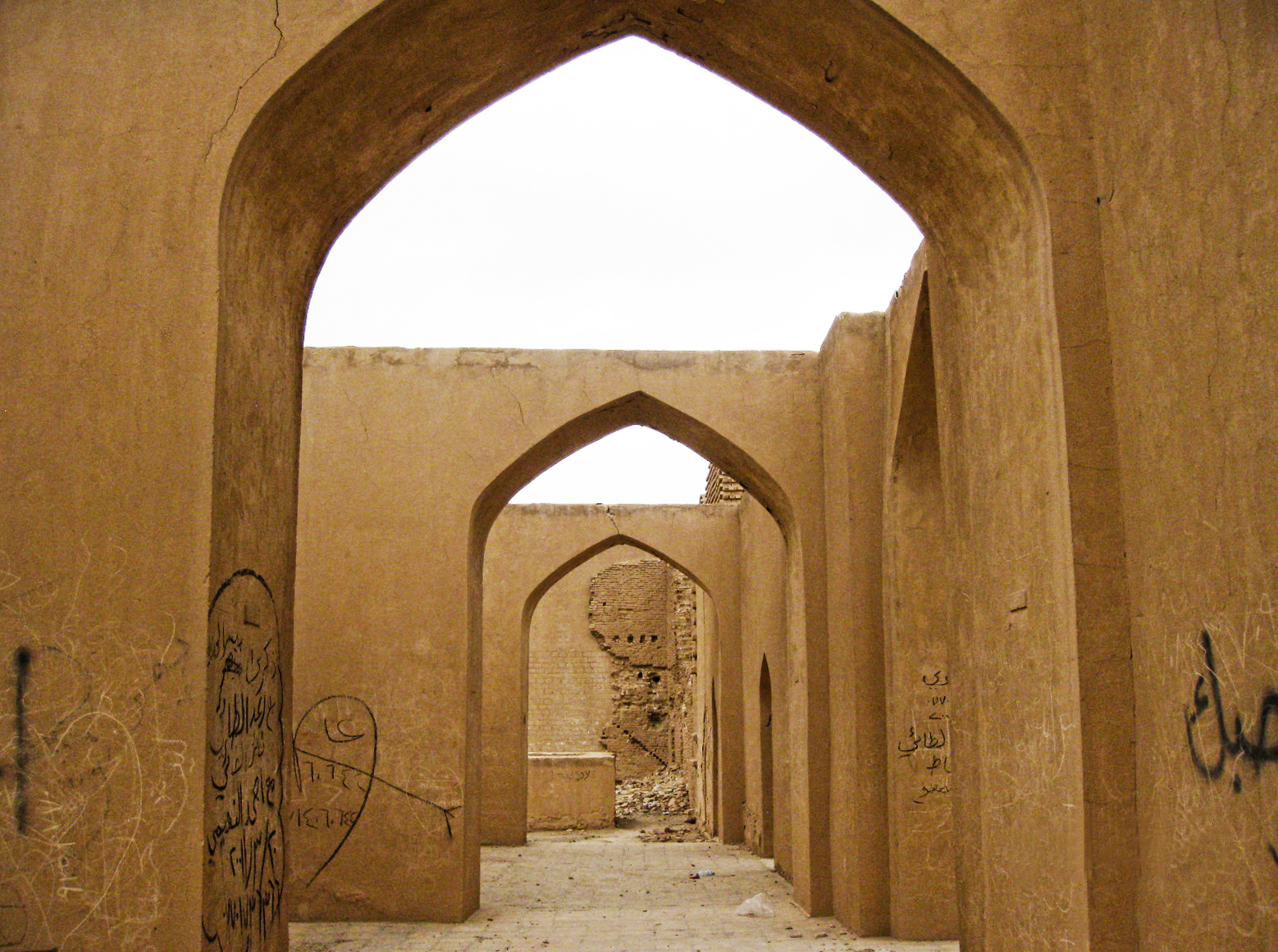
View of the corridor with pointed arches

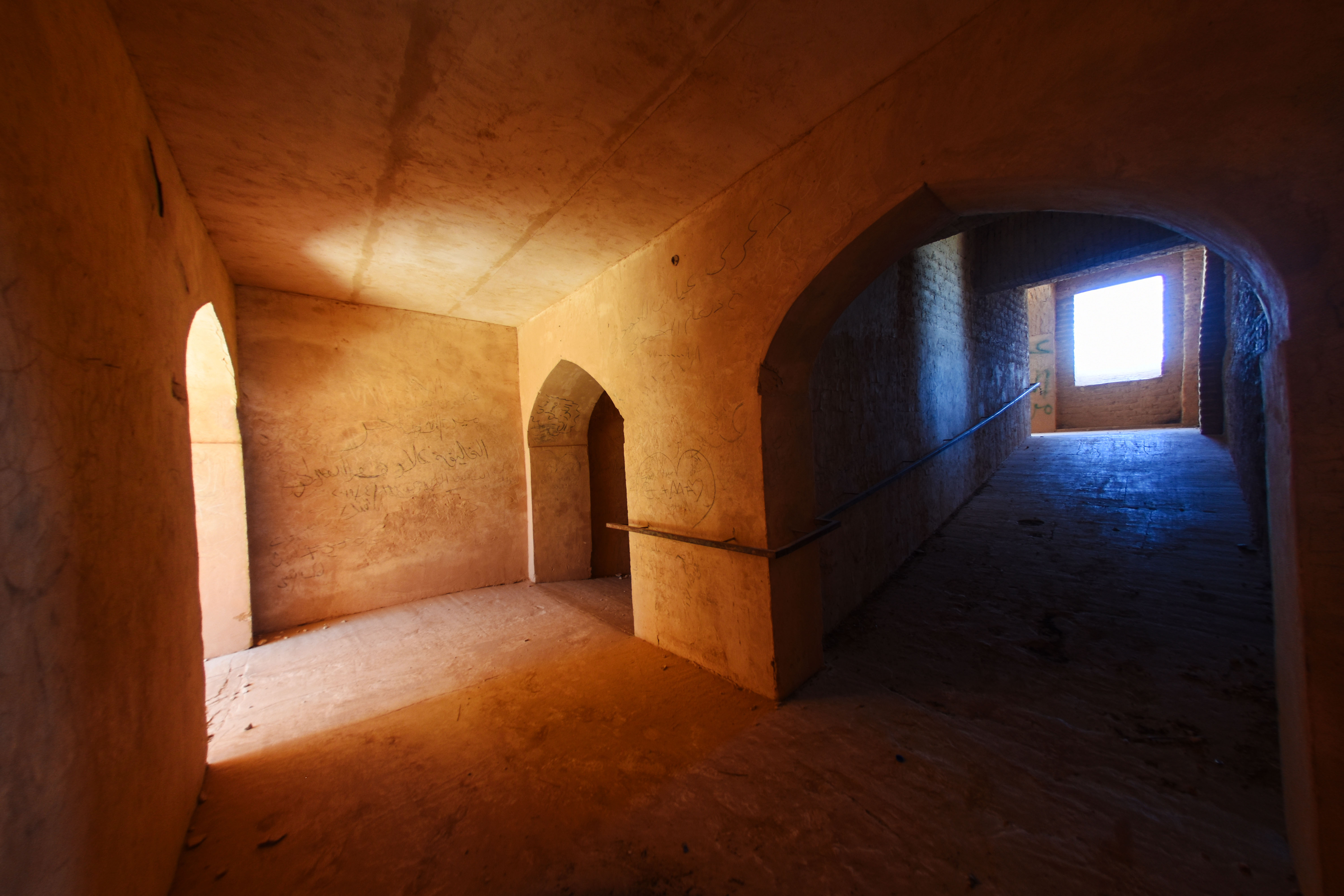
Inside the palace

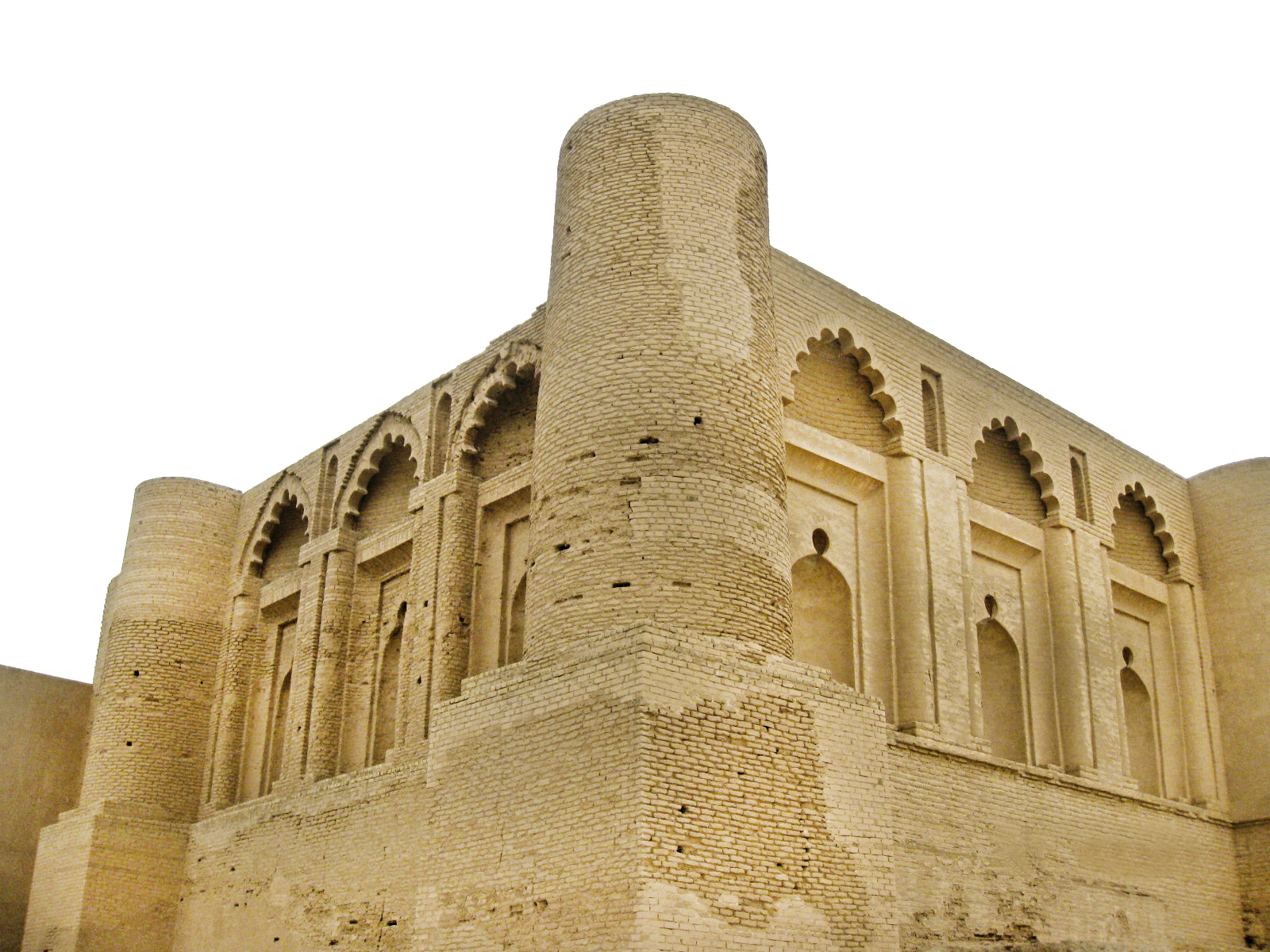
exterior

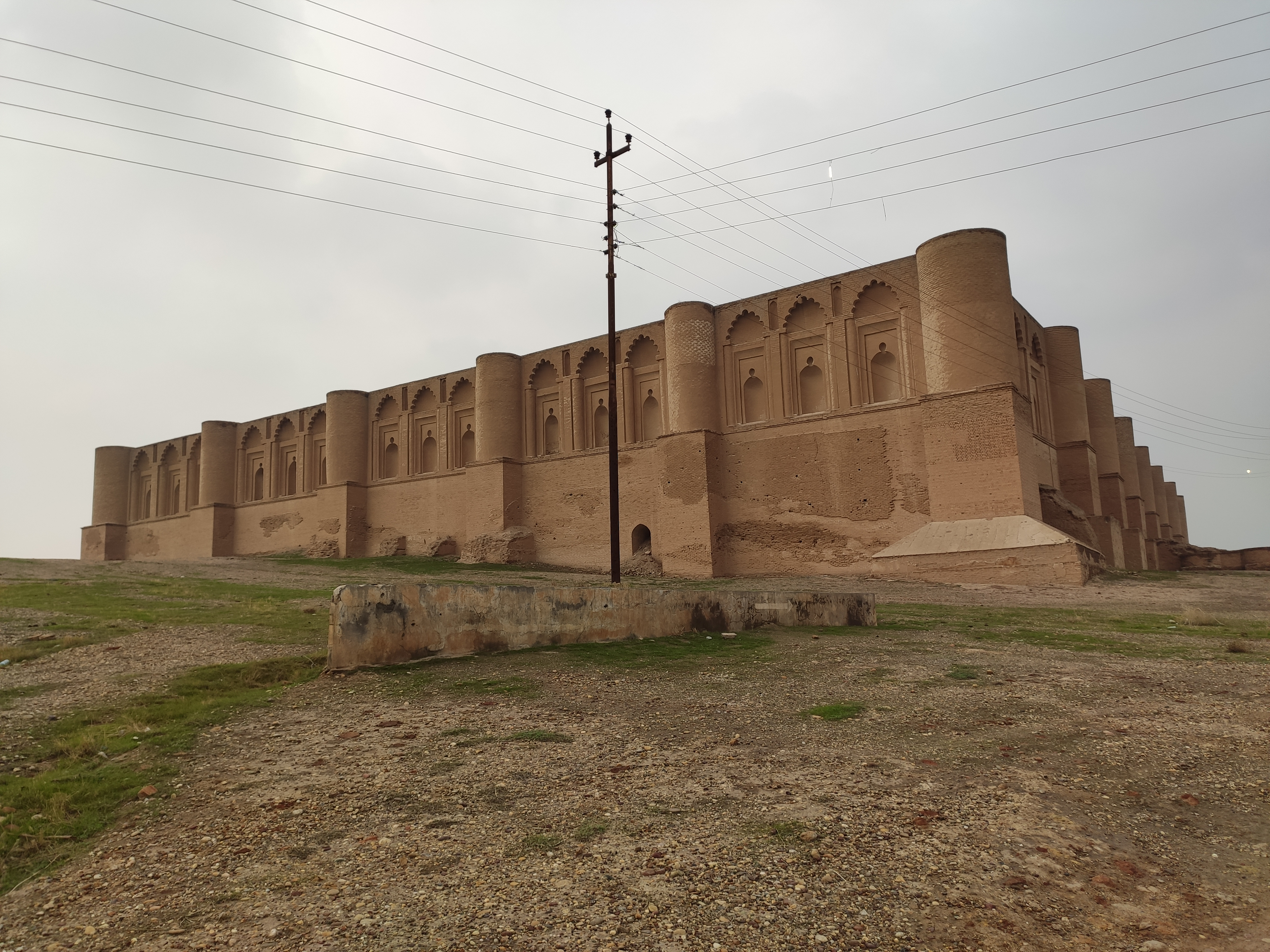
exterior

== See also ==
- Abbasid Architecture
- Abbasid Samarra
