= Abbasid Samarra =

UNESCO World Heritage Site in Iraq

Samarra
- سامَرّاء (Arabic)
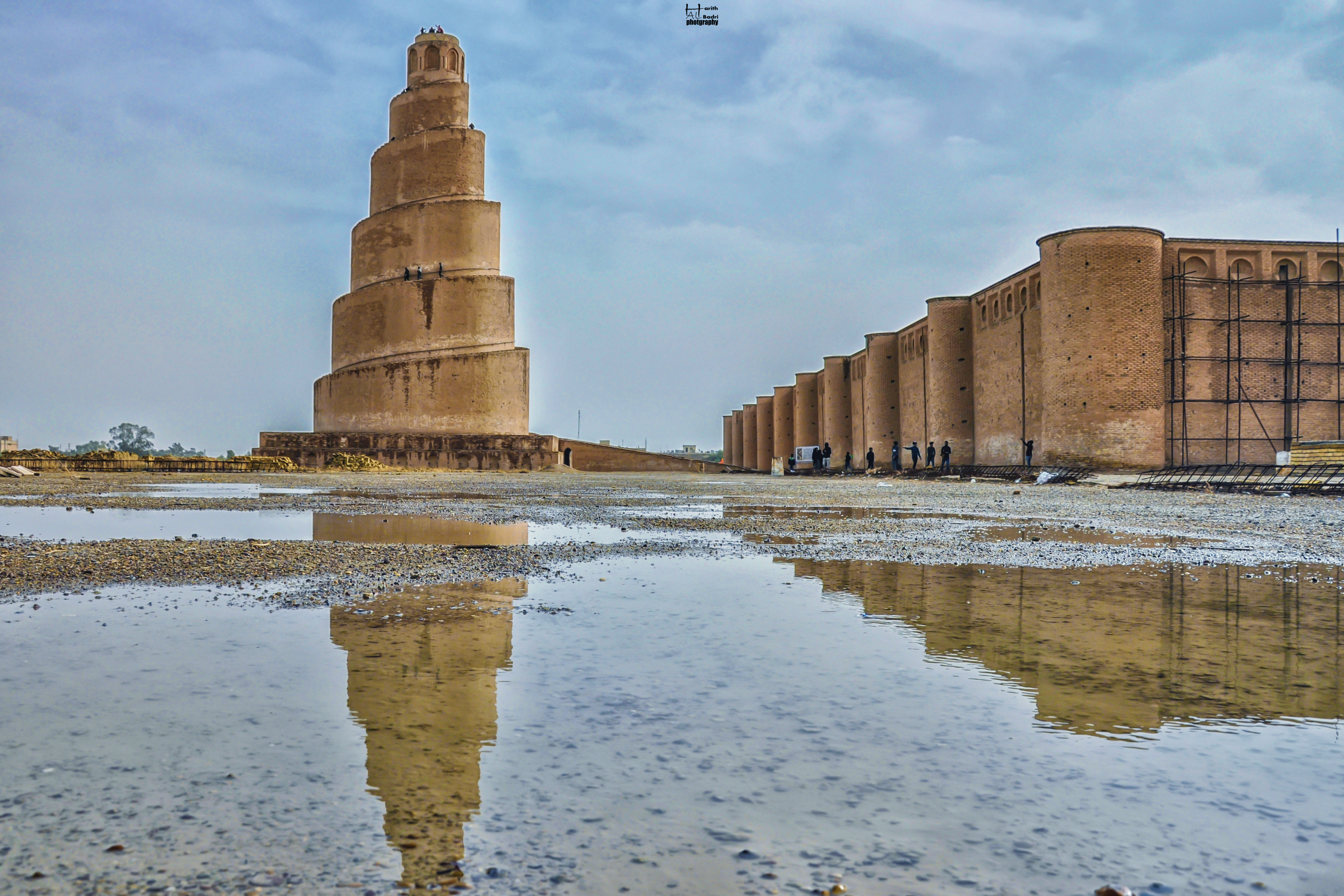
- The spiral minaret of the Great Mosque of Samarra

- Location within Iraq
- 34°21′42″N 43°48′07″E
- Type: City
- Location: Samarra, Saladin Governorate, Iraq

History
- Built: 836
- Built by: Al-Mu'tasim, Abbasid Caliphate
- Abandoned: circa 892, with partial settlement thereafter

Site notes
- Condition: Ruined

UNESCO World Heritage Site
- Official name: Samarra Archaeological City
- Criteria: Cultural: ii, iii, iv
- Reference: 276
- Inscription: 2007 (31st Session)
- Endangered: 2007–
- Area: 15,058 ha (37,210 acres)
- Buffer zone: 31,414 ha (77,630 acres)

Samarra is a city in central Iraq, which served as the capital of the Abbasid Caliphate from 836 to 892. Founded by the caliph al-Mu'tasim, Samarra was briefly a major metropolis that stretched dozens of kilometers along the east bank of the Tigris, but was largely abandoned in the latter half of the 9th century, especially following the return of the caliphs to Baghdad.

Due to the relatively short period of occupation, extensive ruins of Abbasid Samarra have survived into modern times. The layout of the city can still be seen via aerial photography, revealing a vast network of planned streets, houses, palaces and mosques. Studies comparing the archeological evidence with information provided by Muslim historians have resulted in the identification of many of the toponyms within the former city.

The archeological site of Samarra was named by UNESCO as a World Heritage Site in 2007, calling it "the best-preserved plan of an ancient large city." The modern city bearing the same name lies within the Abbasid ruins.

== Etymology ==
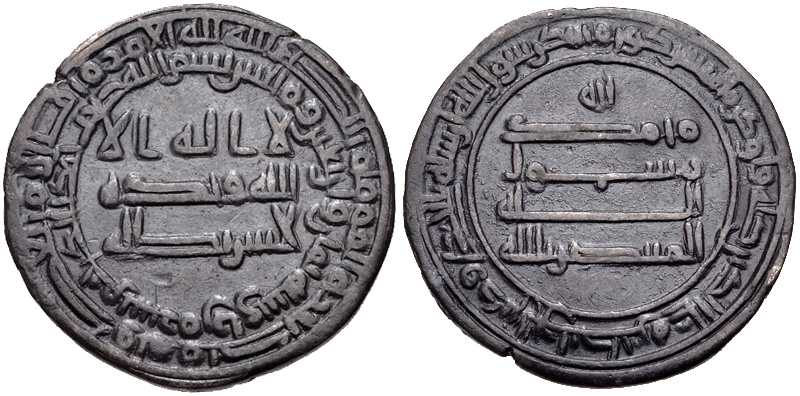
Dirham of al-Muntasir minted in Surra Man Ra'a (Samarra) in 861–862

The toponym Samarra is known to have existed prior to the Islamic period. Classical authors mention the name in various forms, including the Greek Suma (Σουμᾶ), the Latin Sumere and the Syriac Šumara.

The formal name of the Abbasid city was Surra Man Ra'ā (Arabic: سُرَّ مَنْ رَأَى), meaning "he who sees it is delighted". This name appeared on coins and was adopted by some medieval writers. Other contemporary sources, however, used Sāmarrā (سَامَرَّا) or Sāmarrā' (سَامَرَّاء) as variants of the pre-Islamic name, and the latter form eventually became the standard spelling.

== History of the Abbasid city ==
=== Foundation ===
Samarra was founded by the eighth Abbasid caliph al-Mu'tasim (r. 833–842) in 836. Al-Mu'tasim's immediate motivation for the decision was a need to find housing for his newly formed Turkic and other army regiments. These troops, who were from groups that had previously held only a marginal role in the Islamic world, were deeply unpopular among the residents of Baghdad, and violent incidents had repeatedly broken out between the soldiers and Baghdadis. Al-Mu'tasim therefore resolved in ca. 835 to depart from Baghdad, the usual seat of the Abbasid caliphs since 762, (Note: Al-Mu'tasim's move from Baghdad was not without precedent; Harun al-Rashid (r. 786–809) had moved to Raqqa and formed a new administrative complex there, known as al-Rafiqah. (Bearman et al. 2002, s.v. "al-Rakka")) and create a new capital city of his choosing.

Following a period of searching for an ideal spot, al-Mu'tasim settled on a site approximately 80 mi (130 km) north of Baghdad on the east side of the Tigris, near the head of the Nahrawan Canal. After sending men to buy up the local properties, including a Christian monastery, the caliph had his engineers survey the most suitable places for development. By 836, buildings had been erected at the site and al-Mu'tasim moved into the new city.

From the start, construction at Samarra was undertaken on a massive scale. Space was no object; land was plentiful and cheap, with little in the way of preexisting settlements to hinder expansion. Al-Mu'tasim marked out various allotments in the new city and granted these spaces to various elites of the army and administration for them to develop. Numerous cantonments were established for the army regiments, who in many cases were intentionally segregated from the residences for the general populace. Markets, mosques and baths for the people were built, together with a number of palaces for the caliph and other prominent individuals. Materials and laborers were shipped in from various parts of the Muslim world to help with the work; iron-workers, carpenters, marble sculptors and artisans all assisted in the construction.

Founding a new capital was a public statement of the establishment of a new regime, while allowing the court to be "at a distance from the populace of Baghdad and protected by a new guard of foreign troops, and amid a new royal culture revolving around sprawling palatial grounds, public spectacle and a seemingly ceaseless quest for leisurely indulgence" (T. El-Hibri), an arrangement compared by Oleg Grabar to the relationship between Paris and Versailles after Louis XIV. In addition, by creating a new city in a previously uninhabited area, al-Mu'tasim could reward his followers with land and commercial opportunities without cost to himself and free from any constraints, unlike Baghdad with its established interest groups. In fact, the sale of land seems to have produced considerable profit for the treasury: as Hugh Kennedy writes, it was "a sort of gigantic property speculation in which both government and its followers could expect to benefit".

=== Under al-Mu'tasim's successors ===
After al-Mu'tasim's death, his successor al-Wathiq (r. 842–847) remained in Samarra. His decision to stay convinced the residents of the new city's permanence and a fresh round of construction began during his reign. Al-Wathiq himself built a new palace, the Haruni (al-Wathiq's given name was Harun) on the bank of the Tigris, which became his new residence.

Al-Mutawakkil (r. 847–861) aggressively pursued new construction, extending the central city to the east and building the Great Mosque of Samarra, the cantonment of Balkuwara and numerous palaces. After moving to Damascus in 858, he returned to Iraq and undertook his most ambitious project, the new city of al-Mutawakkiliyya to the north of Samarra. Included in the new area was the palace of al-Ja'fari (Ja'far being his given name), which he moved into in 860. In the following year, however, he was assassinated, and al-Mutawakkiliyya was abandoned soon after. (Note: Al-Ya'qubi 1892, pp. 265–67; Yarshater 1985–2007, v. 38: pp. 154–56, 170, 190–91; Northedge 2008, pp. 195 ff. The sources agree that the sums that al-Mutawakkil spent on his various projects were enormous, and were likely missed in the decade following his death, when the government frequently ran into fiscal crises.)

The decade following al-Mutawakkil's assassination was a turbulent period, sometimes known as the Anarchy at Samarra, during which the capital was frequently beset by palace coups and troop riots. Al-Mutawakkil's son al-Muntasir (r. 861–862) abandoned al-Ja'fari and moved back to the Jawsaq palace, which remained the residence of his successors. Al-Musta'in (r. 862–866), finding it impossible to control the Samarran regiments, left the city and attempted to establish himself in Baghdad in 865, but the Turks and other troops responded by deposing him and besieging Baghdad until the caliph agreed to abdicate. His two successors, al-Mu'tazz (r. 866–869) and al-Muhtadi (r. 869–870), were similarly overthrown by the army.

Samarra is solitude now,
hugely abandoned to change:
ruins; a frog that calls;
dismemberment's muffled cry.
The city died, is dead
like an elephant being untusked.

— Poem composed by the Abbasid prince Abdallah ibn al-Mu'tazz, who was born in Samarra, regarding the decline of the city.

Al-Mu'tamid (r. 870–892) undertook the last known building projects in Samarra, but in the later period of his reign, he appears to have spent less time in the city. After his death, al-Mu'tadid (r. 892–902) formally returned to Baghdad, thus bringing an end to the Samarran interlude. Al-Muktafi (r. 902–908) at one point considered moving back to Samarra and encamped in the Jawsaq palace, but was eventually dissuaded after his advisers informed him of the high costs of the plan.

On its own, Samarra had little to incentivize residents to stay; the water supply was problematic and the city seems to have been heavily dependent on supplies from elsewhere. As long as the caliphs were willing to pour vast sums of money into the city, it continued to survive; with the return of the caliphs to Baghdad, this investment dried up and soon much of the city was abandoned. In the following centuries, a few isolated settlements survived within the ruins, but the vast portion of the city soon became uninhabited.

== Overview of the city ==
Map of Abbasid Samarra

The known remains of Samarra occupy an area of approximately 58 km^{2} (22 mi^{2}), mostly on the east side of the Tigris. Out of 6,314 registered buildings at the site (as of 1991), only nine still have any components of significant height; the vast majority of the ruins consist of collapsed mounds of rammed earth and scattered debris. At ground level, the remains are mostly unimpressive; when viewed from the air, however, the entire plan of the Abbasid city, with its buildings and street pattern, can clearly be seen.

=== Central Samarra ===
The core area of the city was initially constructed in the reign of al-Mu'tasim, with further development taking place under al-Wathiq and al-Mutawakkil.

The street layout of this area was dominated by a series of long, broad avenues which ran north-to-south and northwest-to-southeast. These avenues are described in detail by the Muslim historian and geographer al-Ya'qubi, who lists the various buildings and allotments which were located along each one. In between the avenues were a great number of smaller streets and housing blocks, together with several larger buildings.

The residents of this section of the city were a mixture of civilians and military personnel. In some cases, the cantonments of the troops were explicitly segregated from the rest of the populace. Numerous army commanders, together with their regiments, were granted allotments here, including those of the Turks, Faraghina, Ushrusaniyya, Maghariba, Ishtakhaniyya, Jund, Shakiriyya, Arabs and Khurasanis. Several bureaucrats, Abbasid princes and other personages also had allotments along the avenues.

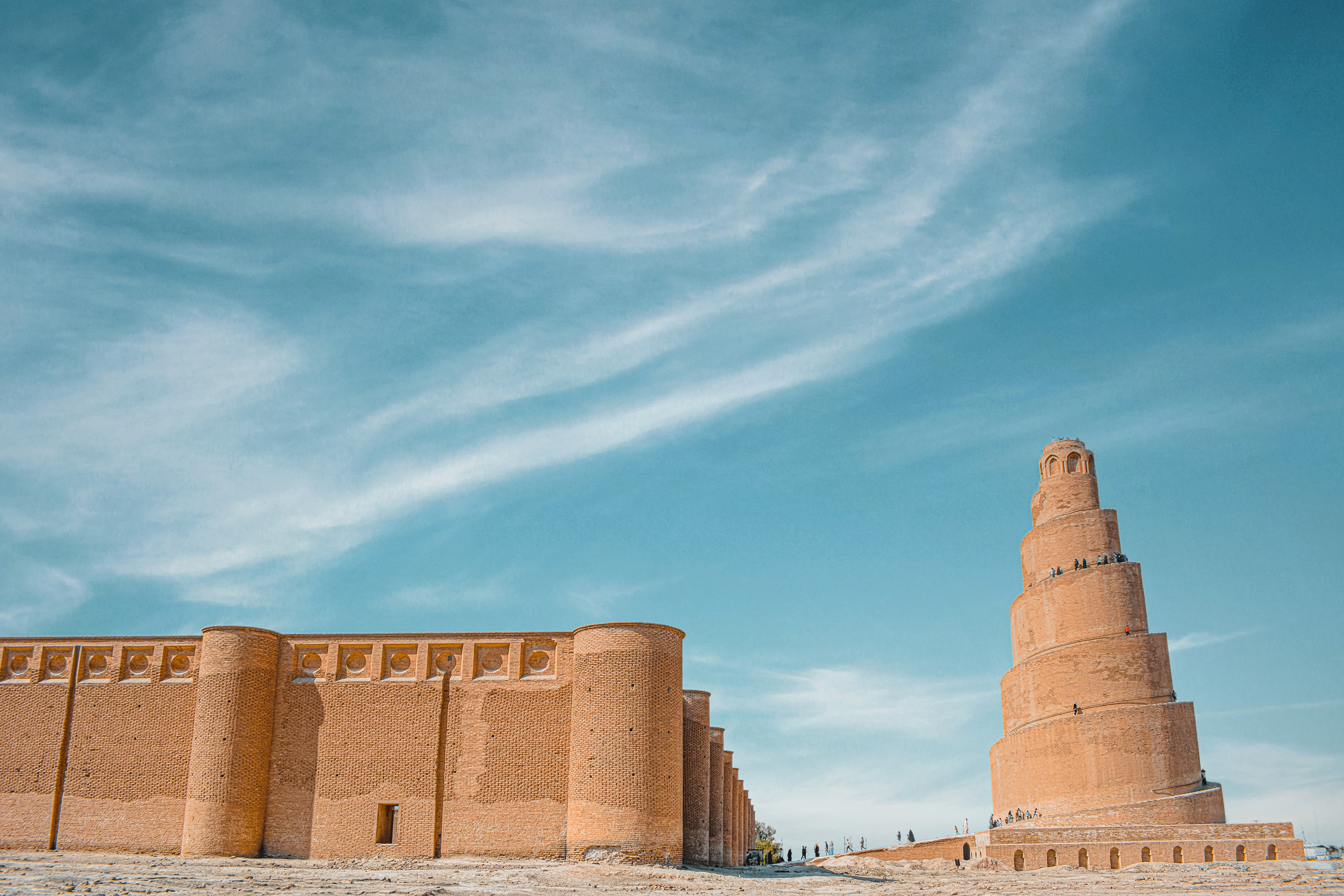
Great mosque of Samarra, built between 848 and 851 by the Abbasid caliph Al-Mutawakkil (largest mosque at the time)

Besides residences, a number of other buildings were located in this area, including the public and private stables, the office of the Bureau of the Land Tax (diwan al-kharaj), and the great prison. The markets, as laid out by al-Mu'tasim, are described as having broad rows, with each type of merchandise sold in a separate section. Near the markets was the gibbet from which the rebel Babak Khorramdin was hanged (khashabat Babak), and which served as a place for displaying executed persons. On the Tigris were a great number of wharves, where provisions from Mosul and other cities were unloaded.

The original mosque, laid out by al-Mu'tasim, soon became too small for the city's residents; it was eventually demolished by al-Mutawakkil, who replaced it by building the Great Mosque of Samarra in the vicinity of al-Hayr. This mosque, the largest in the world at the time, measured 239 m × 156 m (784 ft × 512 ft) and had 17 aisles in the prayer hall. An enclosure wall measuring 443 m × 374 m (1,453 ft × 1,227 ft) featured covered porticoes to accommodate additional worshippers. The spiral minaret, also known as the Malwiya, is 52 m (171 ft) high and still stands in the rear of the mosque. its design was used as a model for the Mosuqe of Ibn Tulun in Cairo, which is the oldest mosque in Egypt to largely retain its original form, since Samarra was where Ibn Tulun had spent much of his early career before being sent to Egypt as a governor.

=== Al-Matira ===
Al-Matira was a cantonment located to the south of central Samarra. It was established two farsakhs (12 km) south of the initial city construction, at the site of a preexisting village.

Al-Matira was first allotted by al-Mu'tasim to the Ushrusanan general al-Afshin, together with the Ushrusaniyya and others in his service. Al-Afshin built a residence for himself, and on the caliph's orders, he also constructed a small market, as well as mosques and baths. Following the execution of al-Afshin in 841, al-Matira was granted to the Turkish general Wasif by al-Wathiq. During the reign of al-Mutawakkil, his son al-Mu'ayyad took up residence there.

Al-Matira survived the abandonment of Samarra by the caliphs, and remained occupied at least until the 13th century.

=== Dar al-Khalifa ===
On the northern end of central Samarra was the Palace of the Caliph (dar al-khalifa). This site served as the official seat of government during the reigns of al-Mu'tasim, al-Muntasir, al-Musta'in, al-Mu'tazz, al-Muhtadi and al-Mu'tamid.

The palace complex consisted of two primary buildings. The larger one has been identified as the Dar al-'Amma (Public Palace), where the caliph sat in audience and conducted official business, and where the public treasury (bayt al-mal) was housed. On the western side of the palace was the Bab al-'Amma (Public Gate), whose triple iwan still survives. The Bab al-'Amma was often used as a location for public executions and displaying the remains of those killed.

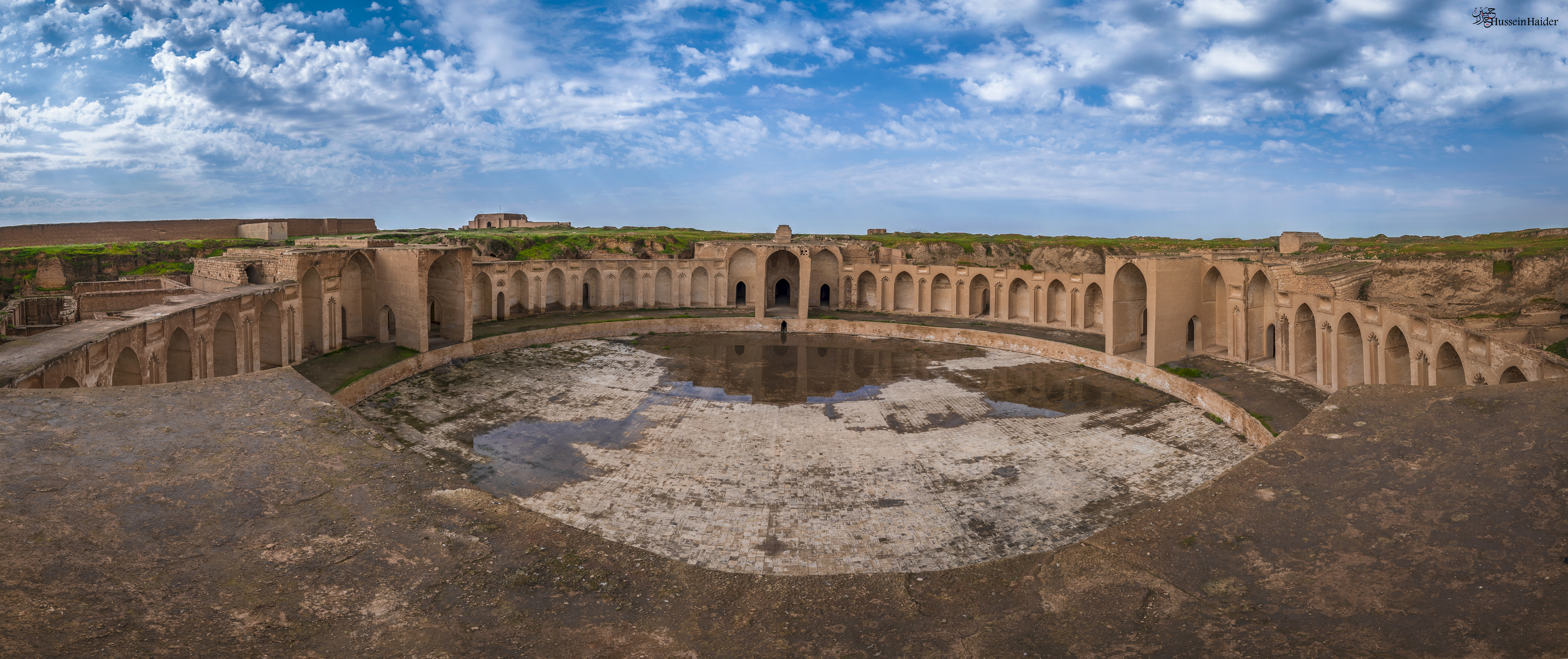
Remains (partly reconstructed) of the Large Serdab or Birka Handasiyya, a sunken hall around a large circular pool, inside the Dār al-Khilāfa palace (around or after 836) built by Al-Mu῾tasim (r. 833–842)

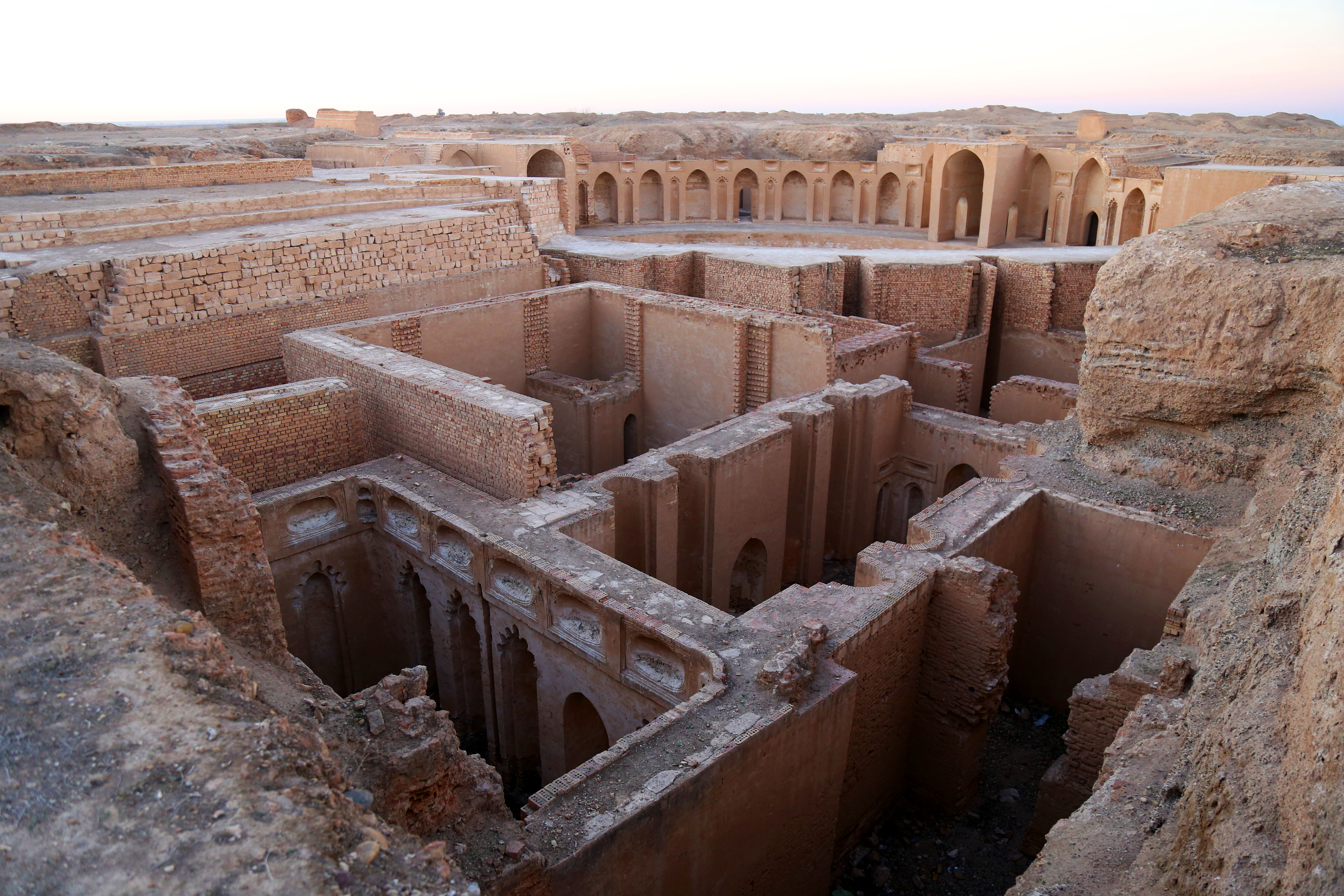
Dār al-Khilāfa aerial view

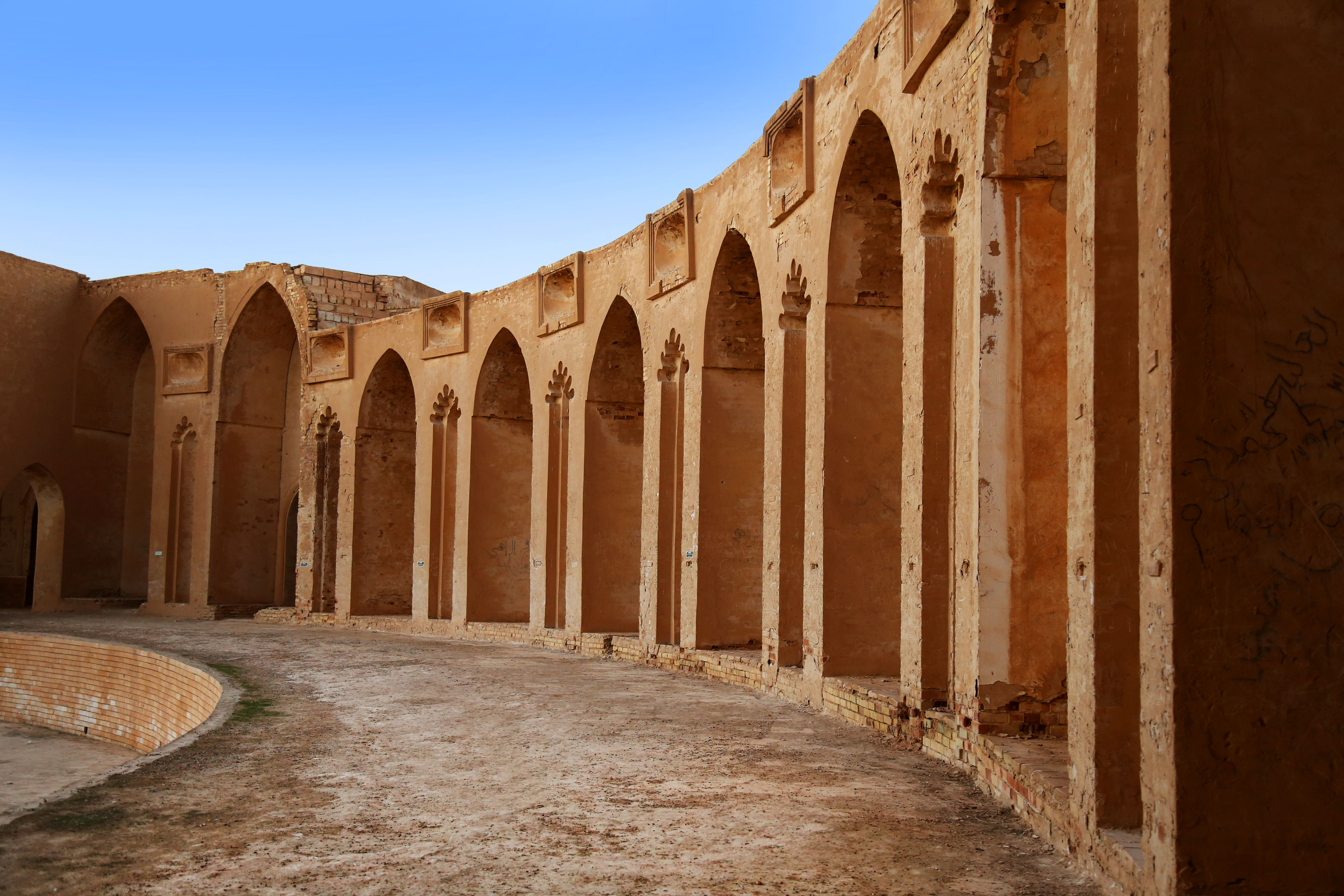
Vaulted arcades of the Large Serdab

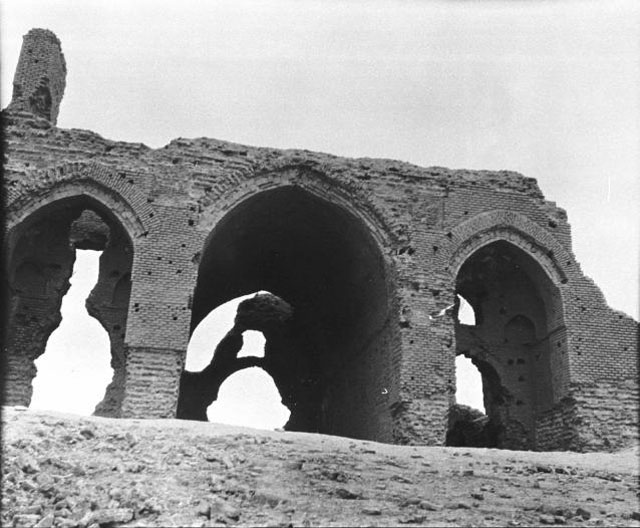
Remains of Bab al-'Amma (c. 836), the main gate of the Dār al-Khilāfa palace in Samarra, Iraq

The smaller building to the north has been identified as the Jawsaq al-Khaqani, which served as the private residence of the caliph. Construction of the Jawsaq palace was entrusted by al-Mu'tasim to the Turk Khaqan 'Urtuj, the father of al-Fath ibn Khaqan and Muzahim ibn Khaqan. It was located within an enclosure wall, and on the eastern side was a maydan or square which overlooked the beginning of a racecourse in al-Hayr. During the violent period following the death of al-Mutawakkil, the Jawsaq palace is frequently mentioned as serving as a prison for prominent persons; al-Mu'tazz, al-Mu'ayyad, al-Muwaffaq, al-Muhtadi, and al-Mu'tamid all were incarcerated there at various points in time.

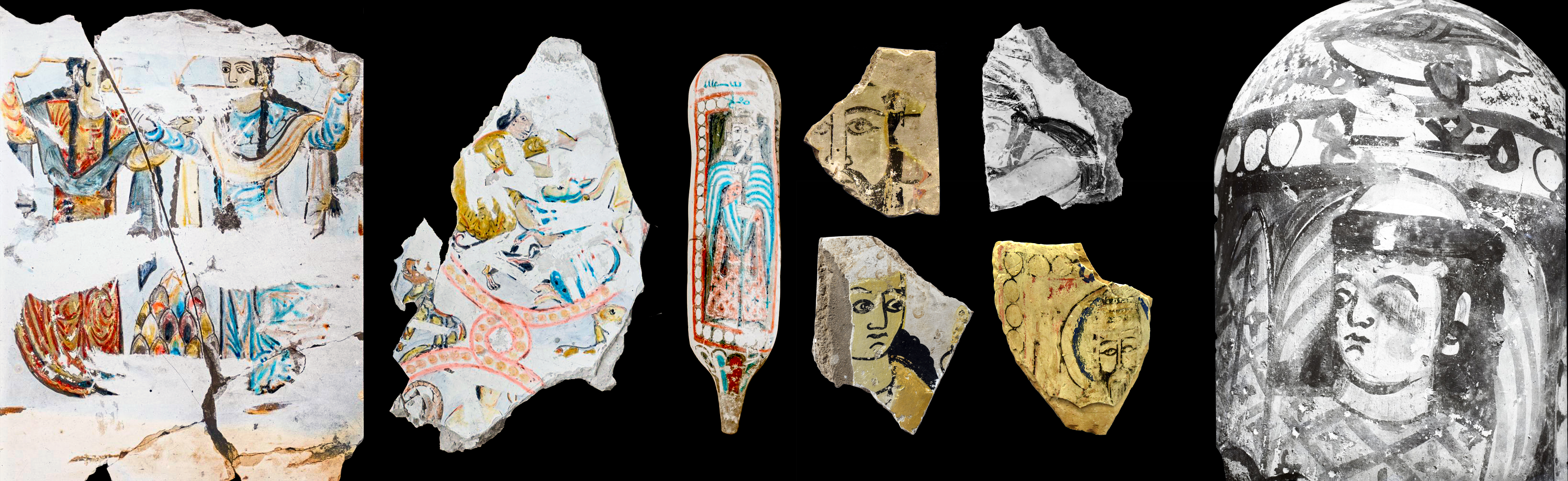
Wall frescos from the Palace of the Caliph

=== Cantonment of Khaqan 'Urtuj and al-Waziriyya ===
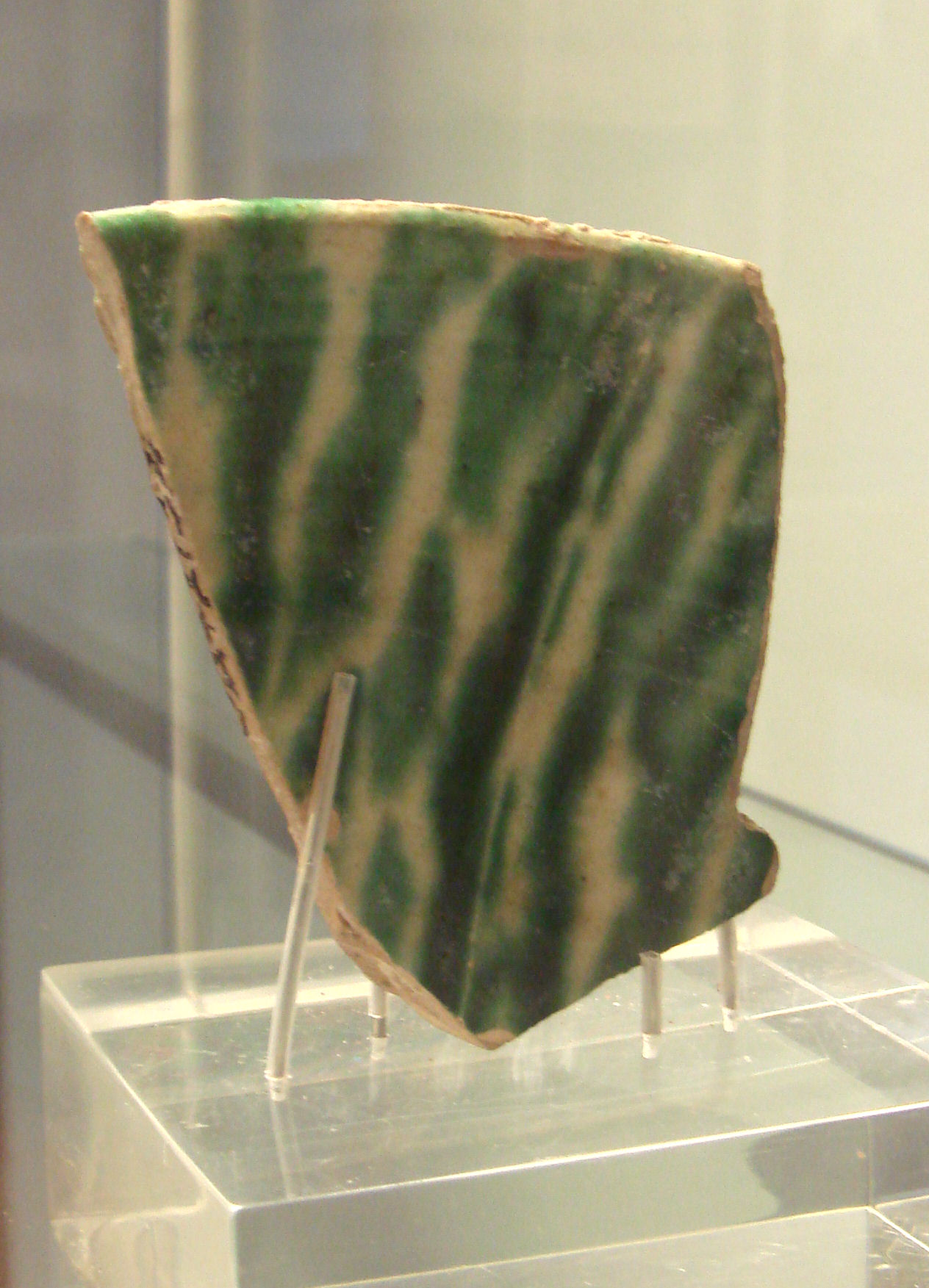
Chinese-made sancai pottery shard, 9–10th century, found in Samarra, an example of Chinese influences on Islamic pottery

On the northern side of the Dar al-Khalifa was a walled cantonment area. This site has been identified as the area allotted by al-Mu'tasim to Khaqan 'Urtuj and his followers, who were said to be segregated from the general populace. At some point, the cantonment appears to have housed the servants who worked in the caliphal palace. A smaller palace (possibly the 'Umari palace built by Khaqan 'Urtuj) and storehouses were located here, and al-Hayr marked the eastern boundary of the area.

Immediately to the north of the cantonment of Khaqan 'Urtuj was a second, diamond-shaped area. This cantonment is tentatively identified as al-Waziriyya, containing the Waziri palace built by Abu al-Wazir. Like the cantonment of Khaqan 'Urtuj, it may have served as housing for the caliphal servants.

=== Al-Karkh and al-Dur ===
Al-Karkh and al-Dur were two cantonments located several kilometers to the north of Samarra proper. Built during the reign of al-Mu'tasim, both areas seem to have housed Turkish regiments and are frequently mentioned together.

Al-Karkh (sometimes called Karkh Samarra in the sources) was built near a preexisting settlement, Shaykh Wali. It was allotted to the Turkish general Ashinas, with strict orders that no strangers (i.e., non-Turks) were to be allowed to live there, and that his followers were not to associate with people of Arab culture. Ashinas built a palace which contained a mosque; after his death, this building was given to al-Fath ibn Khaqan. Details of the settlement of al-Dur, to the north of al-Karkh, are less well known, but it is clear that Turks were settled in this area as well.

Al-Ya'qubi describes the building of mosques, baths and markets in al-Karkh and al-Dur. Both areas continued to be populated following the abandonment of Samarra and seem to have been considered as suburbs of Samarra proper; the tenth-century geographer al-Muqaddasi, for example, refers to both localities as dependencies of Samarra. They appear to have survived until at least the 13th century.

=== Al-Hayr ===
Al-Hayr was a massive hunting reserve to the east of Samarra. Surrounding it was a wall of coursed earth, enclosing an area of 114 km^{2} (44 mi^{2}). The western portion of the wall bordering the central city was repeatedly demolished and rebuilt to make way for new construction, including that of the Great Mosque. Within al-Hayr were a series of racecourses, with each track measuring several kilometers in length. The layout of these racecourses varied; one was parachute-shaped, another bottle-shaped, and a third shaped as a cloverleaf.

=== Al-Haruni ===
Al-Haruni was a palace built by Harun al-Wathiq on the Tigris. Al-Wathiq resided here during his reign, as did al-Mutawakkil prior to the construction of al-Ja'fariyya in 859.

=== Balkuwara ===
Balkuwara was a cantonment located to the south of al-Matira. A major feature of this site was the palace, which served as the residence of al-Mu'tazz during the caliphate of his father al-Mutawakkil. Built during al-Mutawakkil's reign, the palace overlooked the Tigris and was surrounded by two enclosure walls, with the outer wall measuring 1,165 m × 1,171 m (3,822 ft × 3,842 ft) and the inner measuring 464 m × 575 m (1,522 ft × 1,886 ft). Excavation work undertaken in the early 20th century revealed decorative elements consisting of stucco, frescoes, colored glass windows and niches.

=== Al-Mutawakkiliyya and al-Ja'fari ===
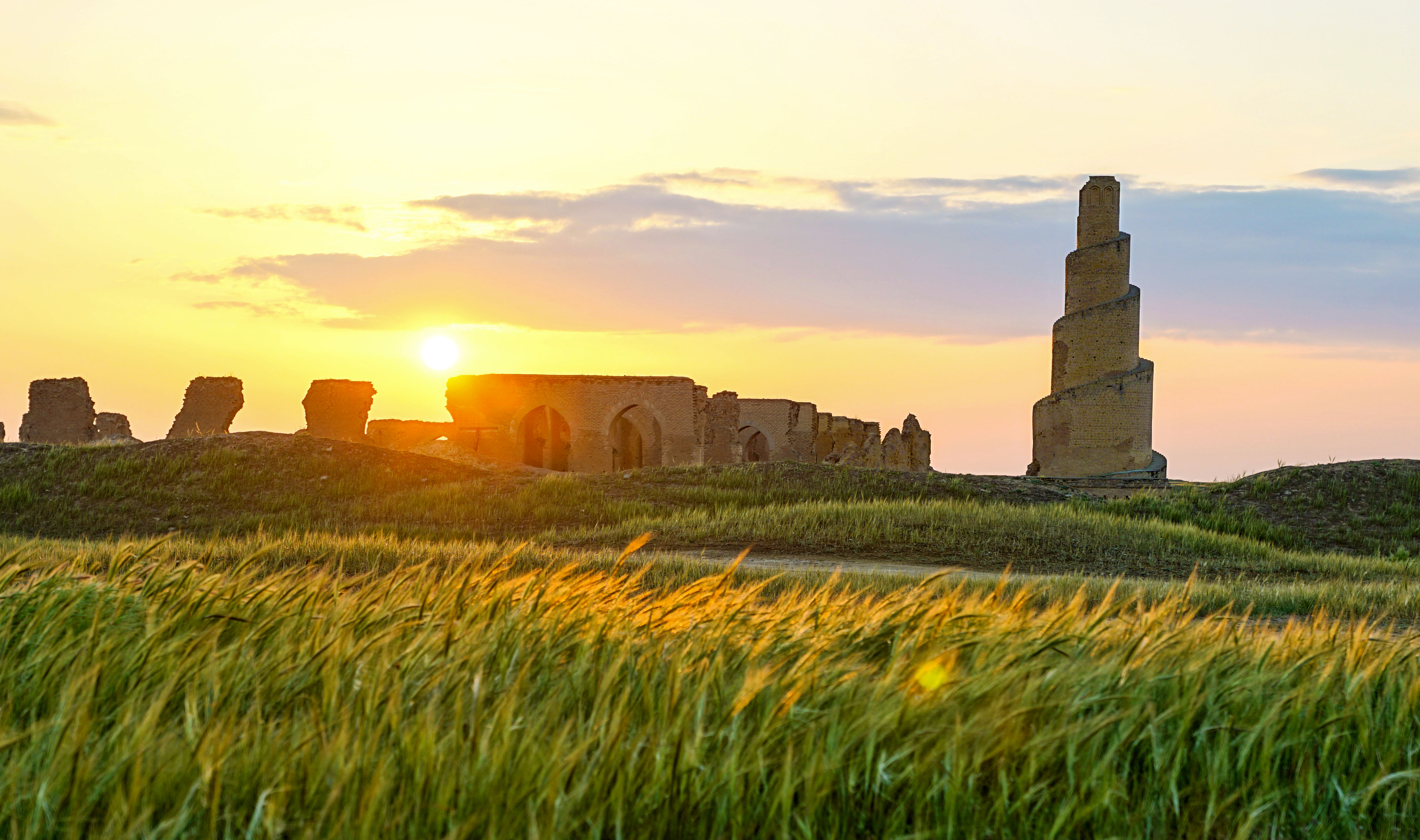
The spiral minaret of the Abu Dulaf Mosque (34 m), smaller than the Great Mosque of Samarra's minaret (52 m)

Al-Mutawakkiliyya was the largest building project of the caliph Ja'far al-Mutawakkil, who ordered the construction of a new city on the northern border of al-Dur in 859. This city, which was built in the vicinity of the settlement of al-Mahuza, was intended to replace Samarra as the residence of the caliphs.

Al-Mutawakkiliyya consisted of an unwalled area, through the center of which ran a north–south avenue. On the western side of the avenue was the Abu Dulaf Mosque. Like the Great Mosque of Samarra, the Abu Dulaf Mosque included a spiral minaret, measuring 34 m (112 ft) high. The avenue ultimately led to the Ja'fari palace, which served as al-Mutawakkil's new residence. It was located in the north of al-Mutawakkiliyya and separated from the rest of the city by a wall. A canal was also dug to supply water to the new city, but this project failed and the canal never functioned properly.

The building al-Mutawakkiliyya marked the high point of the expansion of Samarra; al-Ya'qubi reports that there was continuous development between al-Ja'fari and Balkuwara, extending a length of seven farsakhs (42 km). Despite the significant amount of money spent to construct it, however, al-Mutawakkiliyya was occupied for only a very short time. Al-Mutawakkil took up residence in al-Ja'fari in 860 and transferred the government bureaucracies (diwans) from Samarra, but following his assassination in December 861, his son and successor al-Muntasir ordered a return to Samarra and took up residence in the Jawsaq palace instead.

=== Al-Musharrahat ===
Al-Musharrahat was a complex in the vicinity of Qadisiyya, to the south of Samarra. On the north side was a palace, and on the east and west sides were housing units. A large trapezoidal enclosure branched out from the complex and extended several kilometers to the north into al-Hayr. The site, which evidently served as a hunting palace, is identified with al-Shah, probably built during the reign of al-Mutawakkil.

=== To the west of the Tigris ===
Although the majority of the development in Samarra was located on the east side of the Tigris, several buildings were also constructed on the west bank. Al-Mu'tasim built a bridge across the Tigris and founded developments, orchards and gardens on the west side.

Al-Istablat was a large walled structure located to the south of Samarra. The northern part consisted of a palace that overlooked the Tigris, while the southern area contained a number of housing units. A long outer wall enclosing al-Istablat and the surrounding area was also built. Al-Istablat is believed to be al-'Arus, one of the palaces built by al-Mutawakkil.

Qasr al-'Ashiq was a palace located opposite al-Haruni and the Dar al-Khalifa. It is the best-preserved of the Samarran palaces and the main building was nearly completely restored in the late 20th century. The plan of the palace appears to have been based on that of the Jawsaq. It is identified with al-Ma'shuq, which was built by al-Mu'tamid and served as his residence for part of his caliphate.

Qubbat al-Sulaybiyya is a small octagonal building to the south of Qasr al-'Ashiq. An inner octagonal structure that featured a dome was reached by ramps ascending on four sides. Restoration work in the 1970s included the rebuilding of the dome. Originally built circa 862, it is the oldest surviving example of a domed tomb in Islamic architecture.

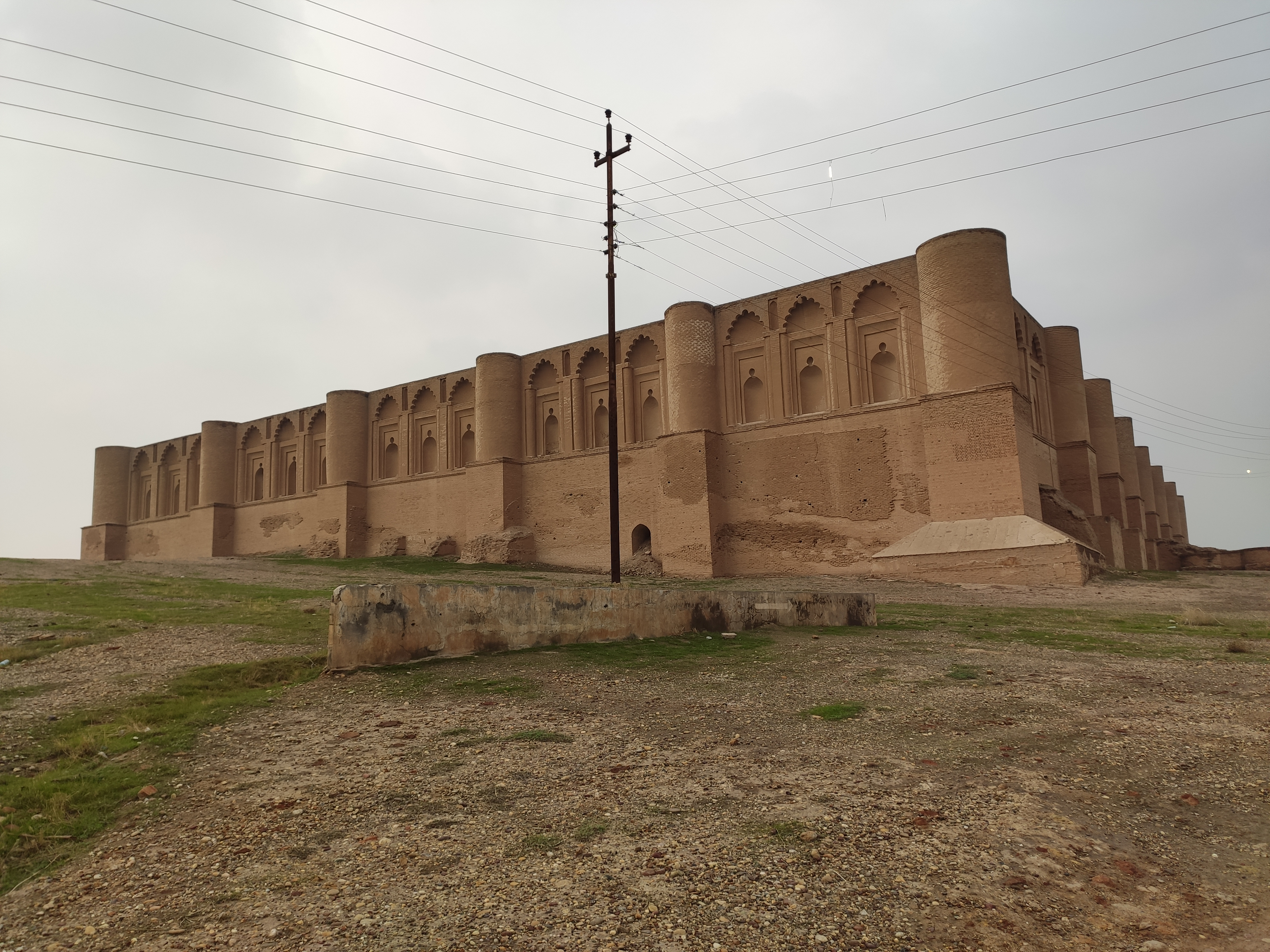
Qasr al-'Ashiq, a palace near Samarra, built between 878 and 882 by Al-Mu'tamid

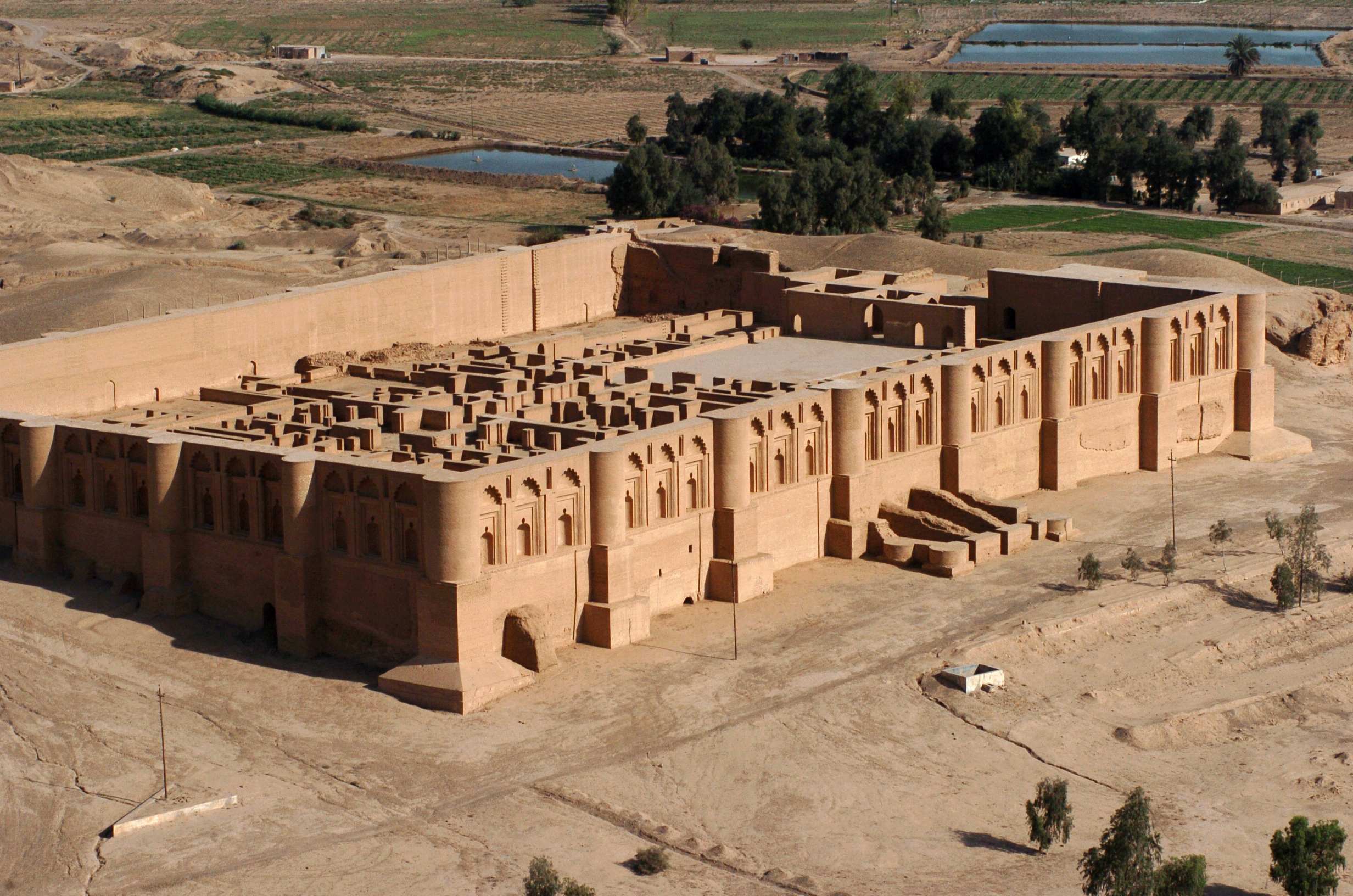
Qasr al-'Ashiq (aerial view)

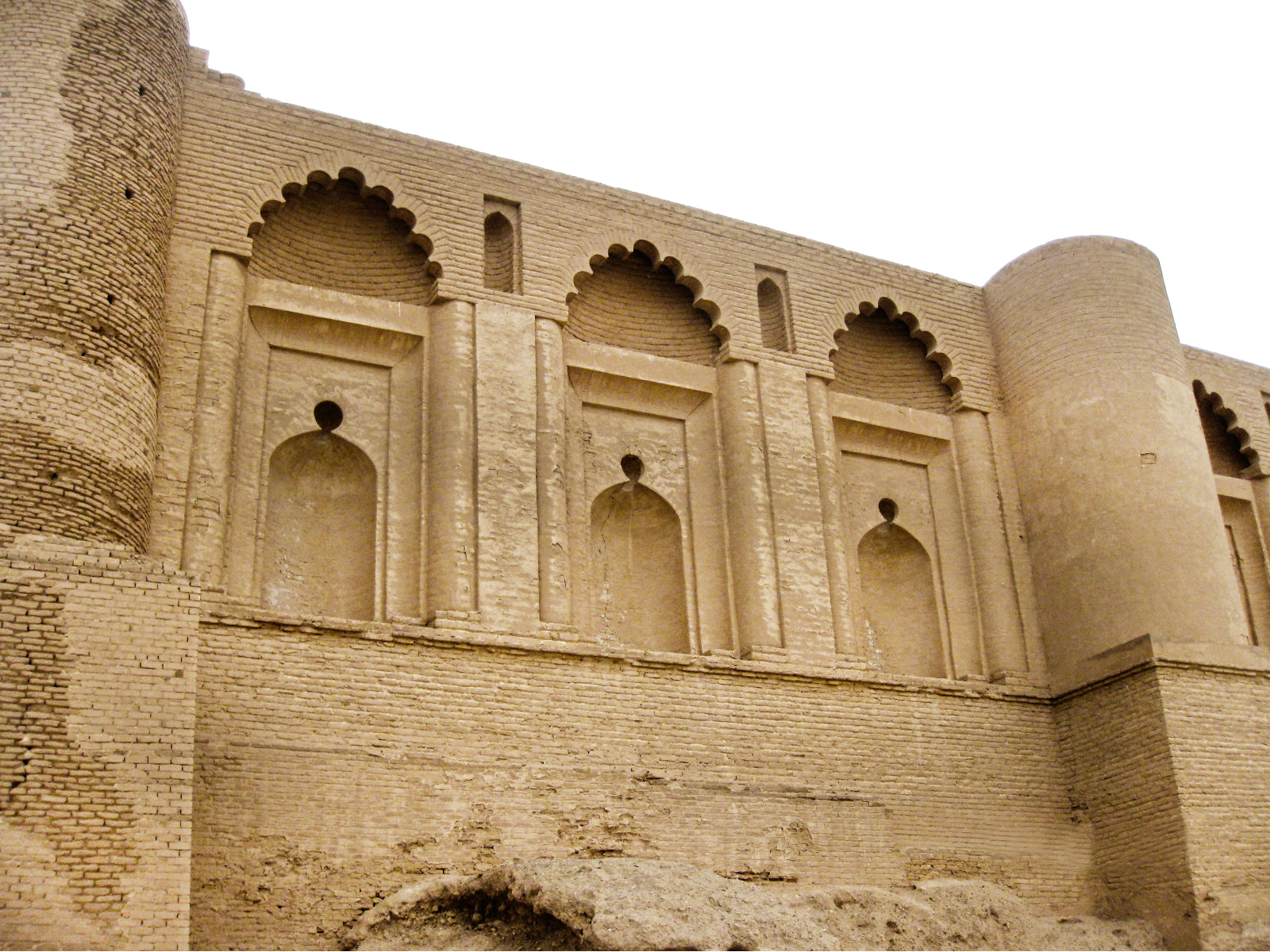
Qasr al-'Ashiq (close view)

== Architectural ornament ==
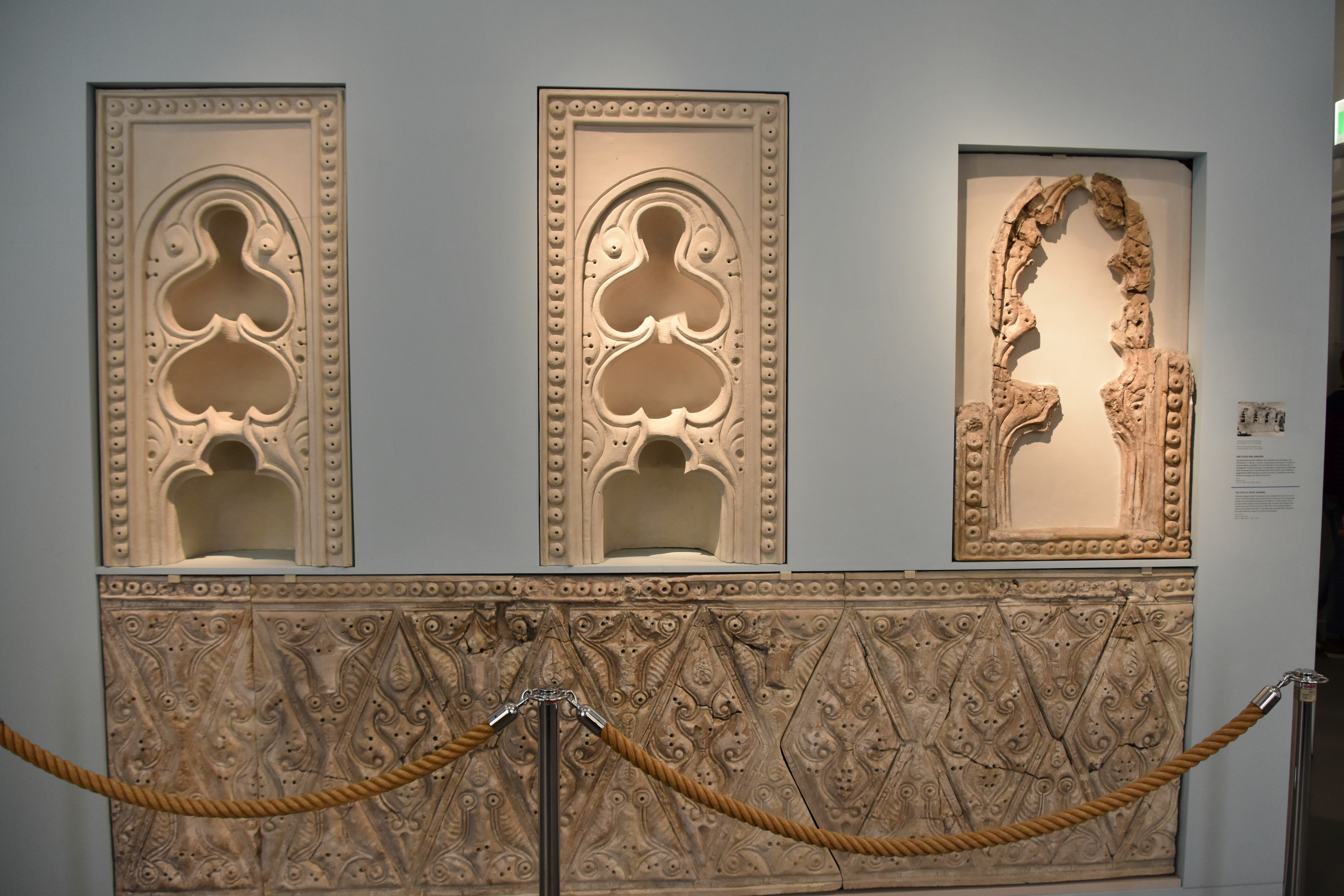
Decorative stucco from Samarra, Iraq, 9th Century C.E.

Ernst Herzfeld, a German archeologist of the twentieth century, conducted a large-scale excavation at the Main Caliphal Palace of Samarra in 1911–13. Herzfeld obtained boards of carved stucco, marble, ceramic decorative elements, and other materials from his exploration. In Herzfeld's publications, he identifies three styles of carved ornament. Those styles being: the Beveled Style, the Second Style, and the Third Style. While his classification of these styles were generally accepted by his successors, research in this field now contests the source and timeline of these proclaimed styles.

The first pattern that Herzfeld observes, appears on fragments of marble that were extracted from the Audience Hall Complex. This pattern is made up of horseshoe shapes which repeat in rows. The next two patterns that he observes are on marble wall and consist of trefoil motifs and petal-shaped symbols. The last motif Herzfeld observes was made of a five-lobed leaf pattern which were representative of palmettes. The source of inspiration in architectural ornament was found in plants, such as in stems, branches that were overlapping or entangled, leaves that were in twos or threes, or from palm leaves and fruits.

Herzfeld's Die Ausgrabungen von Samarra catalogues and sketchbooks describe Audience Hall Complex revetments of wood and monochrome luster tiles featuring Arabic script, vegetation and animals, as well as glossy tiles that were used as decorative art on the walls throughout the Audience Hall Complex. Samarra is a UNESCO World Heritage Site. The UNESCO website states Samarra is one of the best architecturally preserved sites and that many stucco panels have been found throughout on the walls of the Audience Hall Complex.

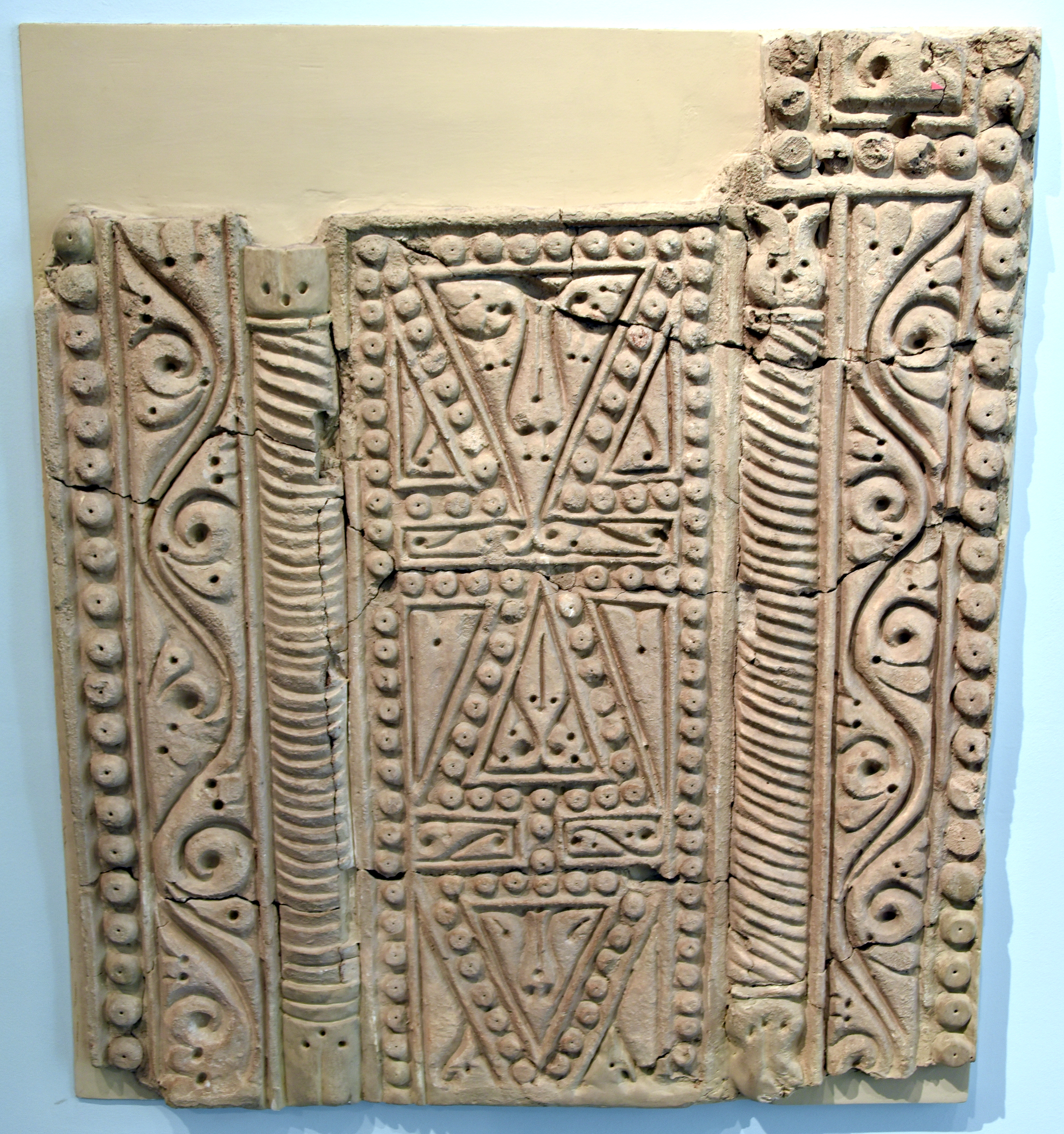
Fragment of carved stucco dado from Samarra, Iraq, 9th century (at the Museum of Islamic Art, Berlin)

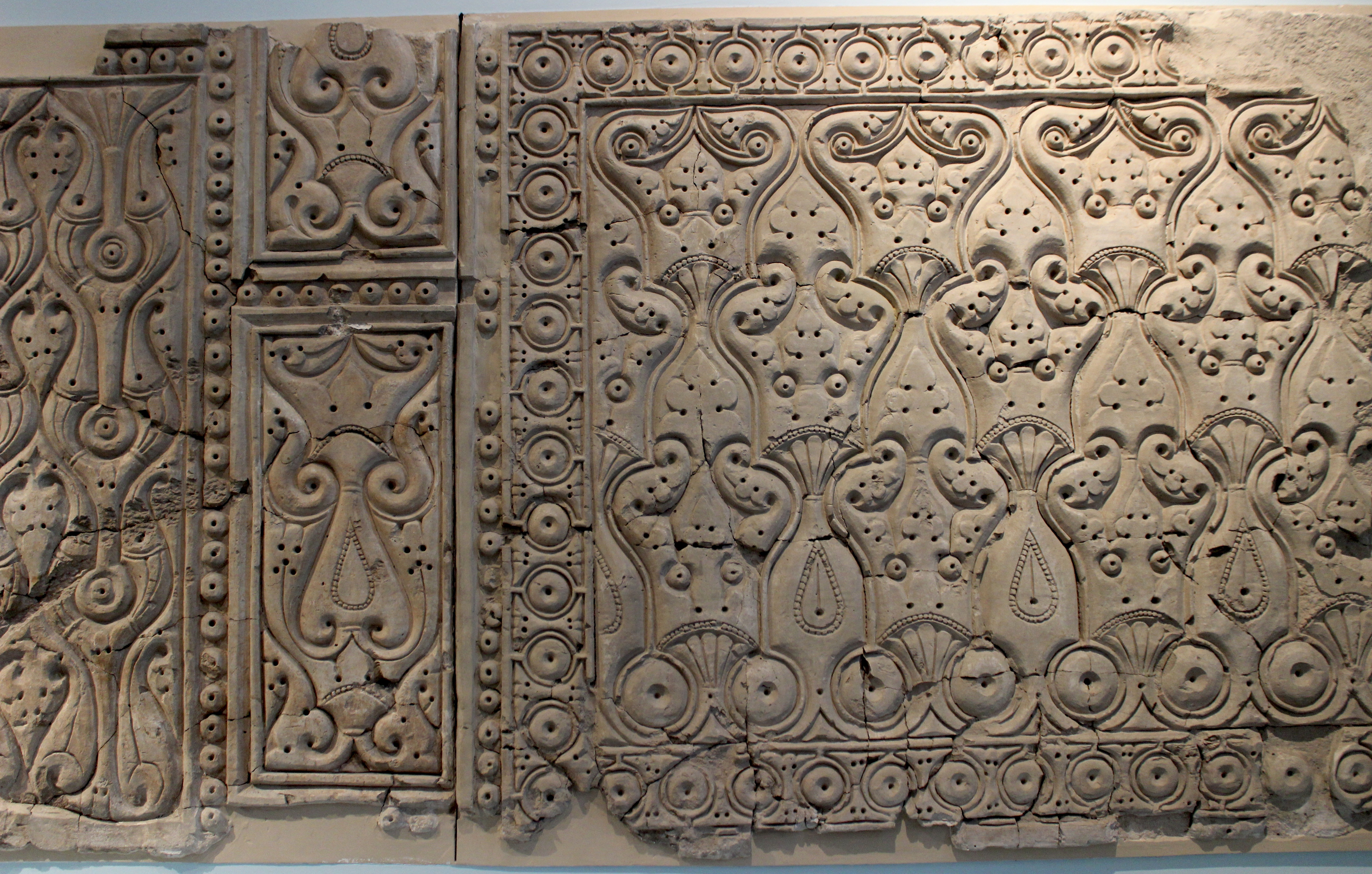
Decorative stucco panel, in the bevelled style, from Samarra (at the Museum of Islamic Art, Berlin)

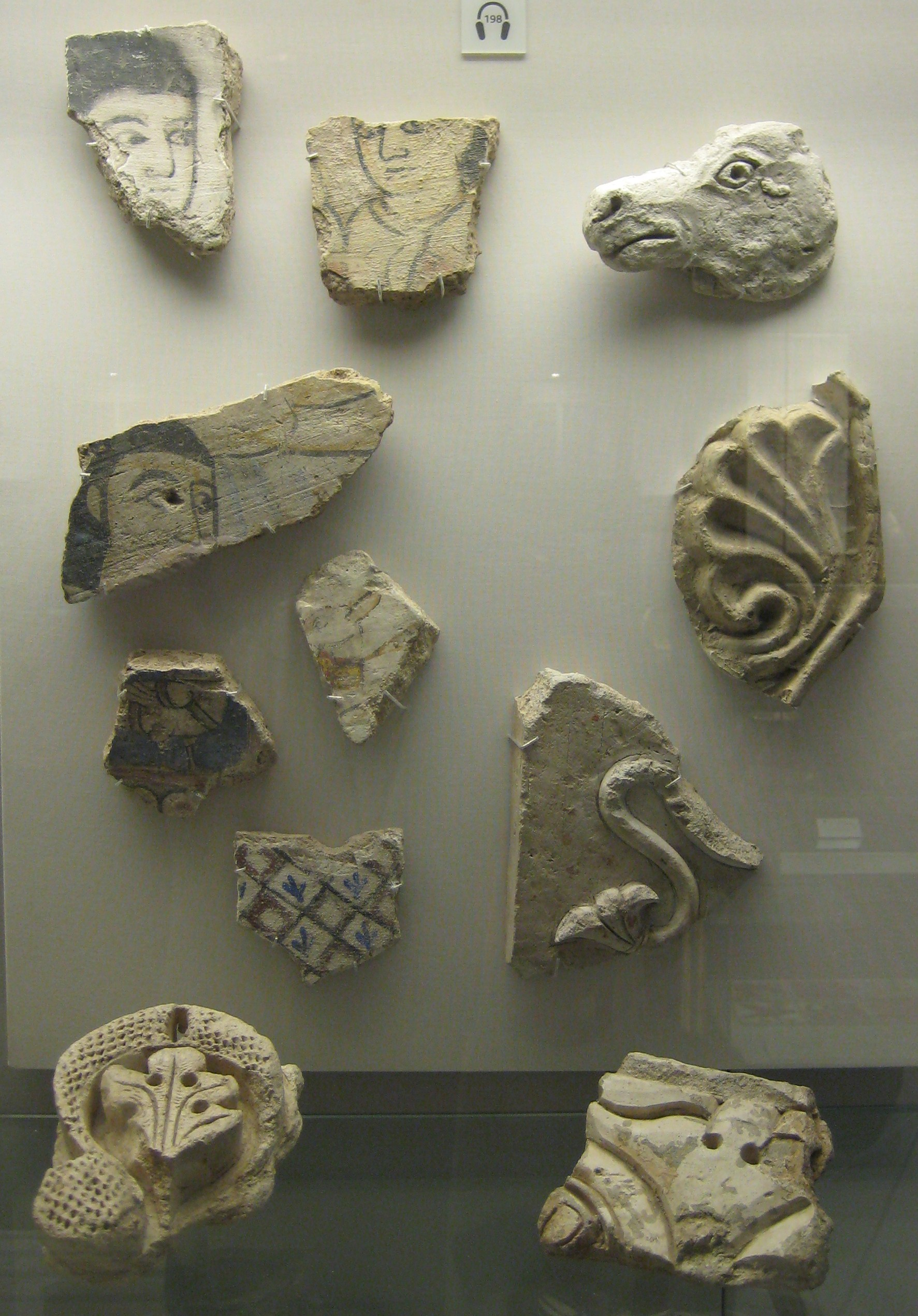
Fragments of painted or carved plaster from interiors throughout Samarra

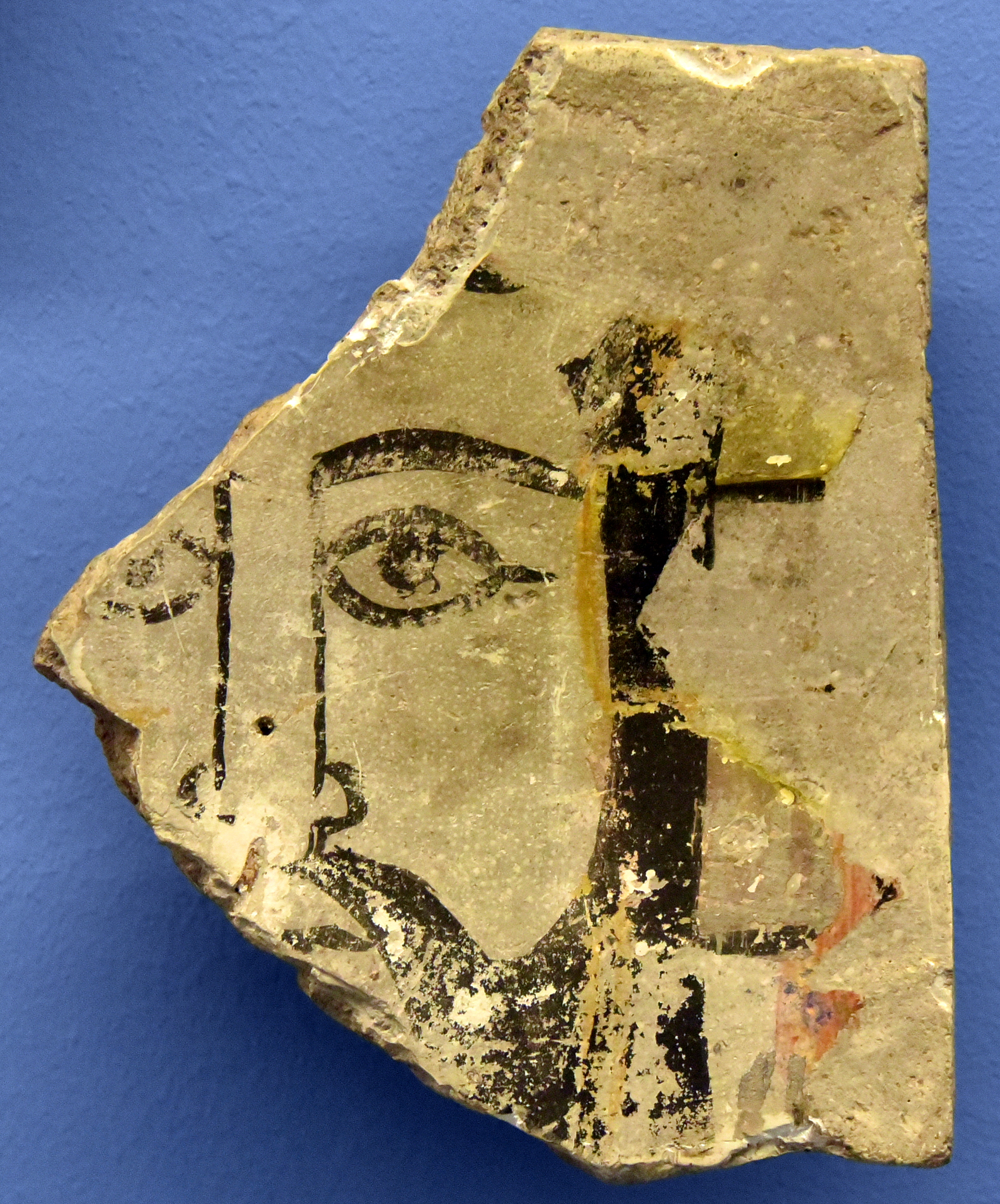
Stucco wall painting of a man from Samarra, Iraq, 9th century C.E.

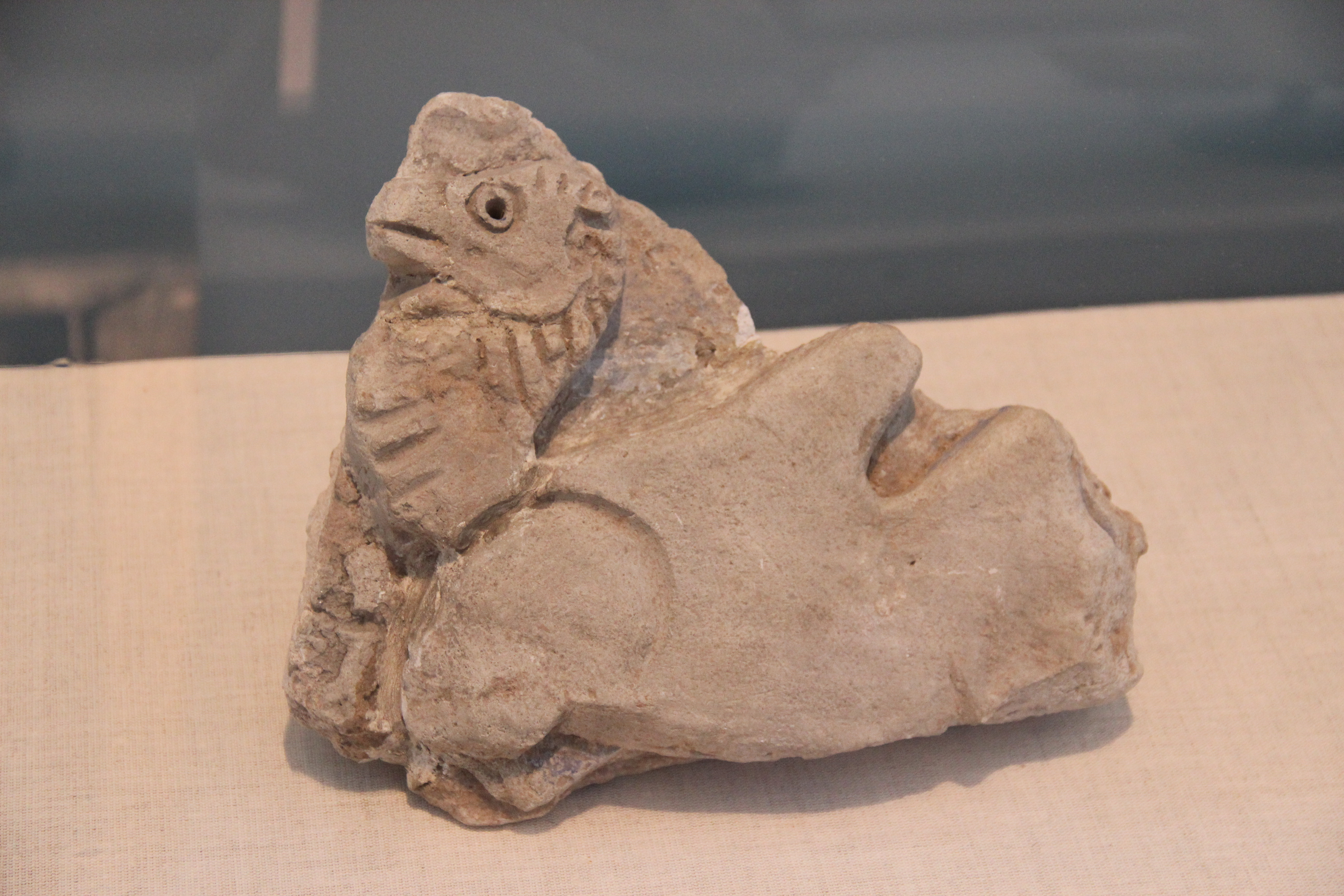
Frieze fragment of a stucco camel from the residence of the Caliph in the Abbasid Samarra, 9th Century C.E.

== Ceramic and Glass ==
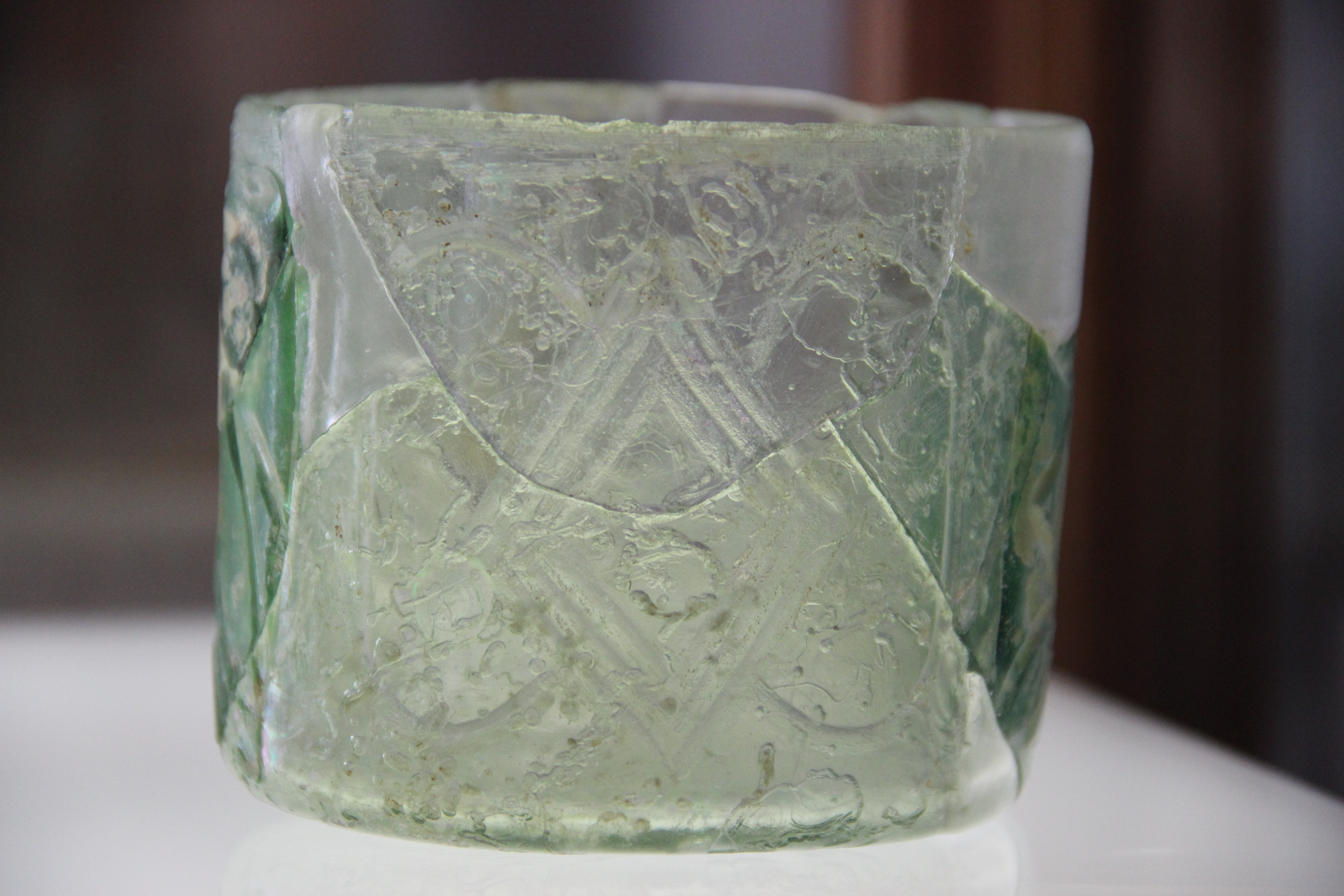
Abbasid Samarra glass

Both glass and ceramic objects were unearthed at Abbasid Samarra. Elaborate glass mosaic tesserae were found in mosques and palaces, such as the Dar al-Khilafa. Glass was made into different shapes and colors throughout Samarra. Windows were often round in form with a raised center and decorative panels often featured glass tesserae cubes. Red was not commonly used in glass cubes compared to traditional colors like black, green, gold, and white.

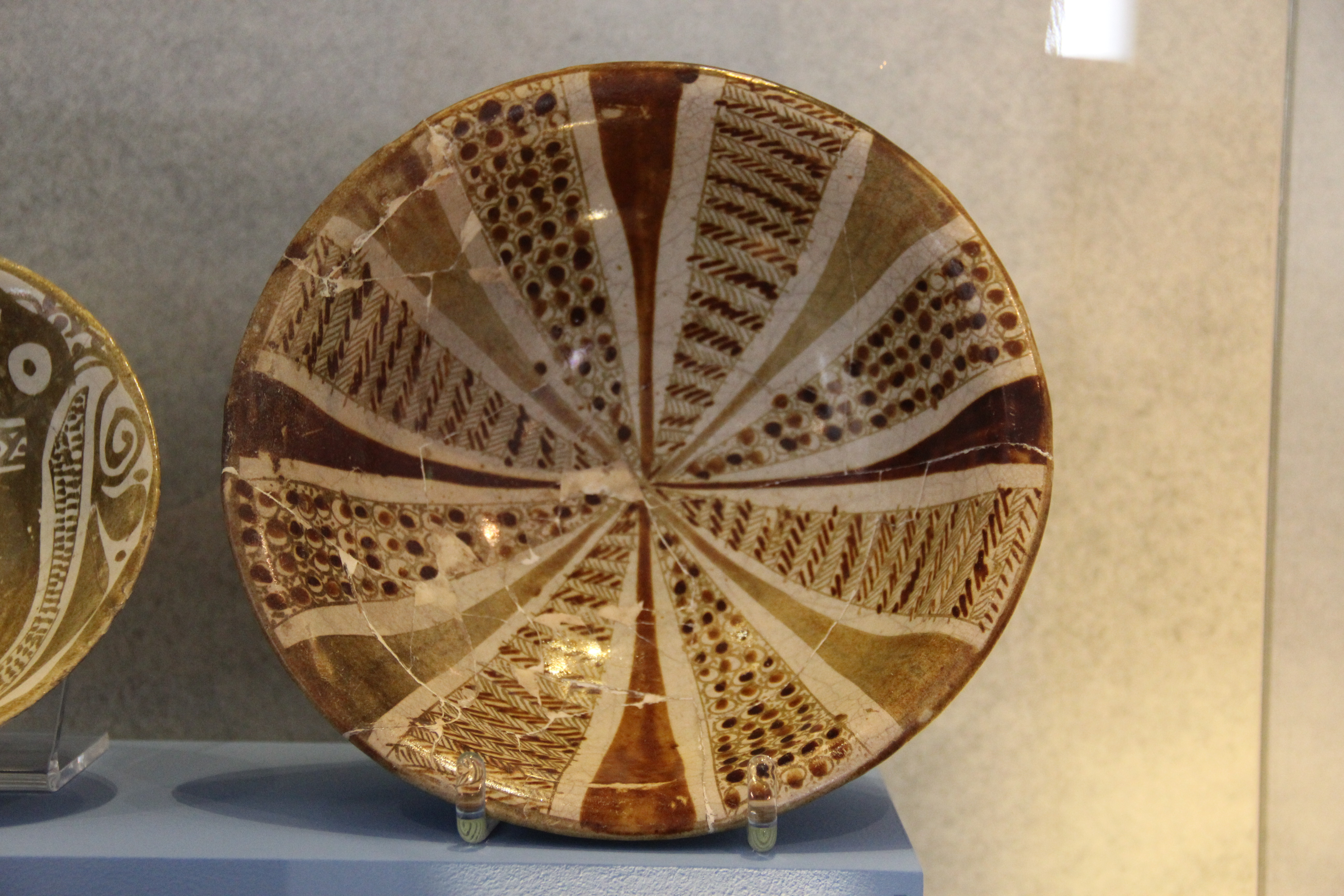
Samarra lustre-painted earthenware

Glazed and unglazed ceramics, as well as glass, featured the Bevelled style designs in Samarra. Chinese tricolor Sancai wares were also popular, and copies were made and distributed throughout Samarra. Various other glazed and decorated ceramics types made at Samarra came to be known as Samarra wares. Samarra wares include contemporary blue-on-white ceramics decorated with cobalt and luster-decorated ceramics, amongst others. Chinese tricolor Sancai wares were also popular, and copies were made and distributed throughout Samarra, showing trade between the two locations. page=212 Hsueh‐man Shen divides the Chinese ceramics found at Siraf and Samarra into five categories: grayish celadon wares, white stonewares, iron and/or copper painted stonewares, green‐splashed white wares, and miscellaneous low‐fired lead‐glazed earthenwares.

Samarra wares consisted of various qualities such as engraved designs, and green on white. Samarra wares were considered to be of higher quality than other ceramics in West Asia during the 9th century. Researchers initially thought the Abbasid Samarra wares were directly modeled after Chinese porcelain of the Tang Dynasty, but now know the styles, inscriptions, colors, and shapes were local to Samarra and not all replications of Chinese ceramics.

== Modern research and developments ==
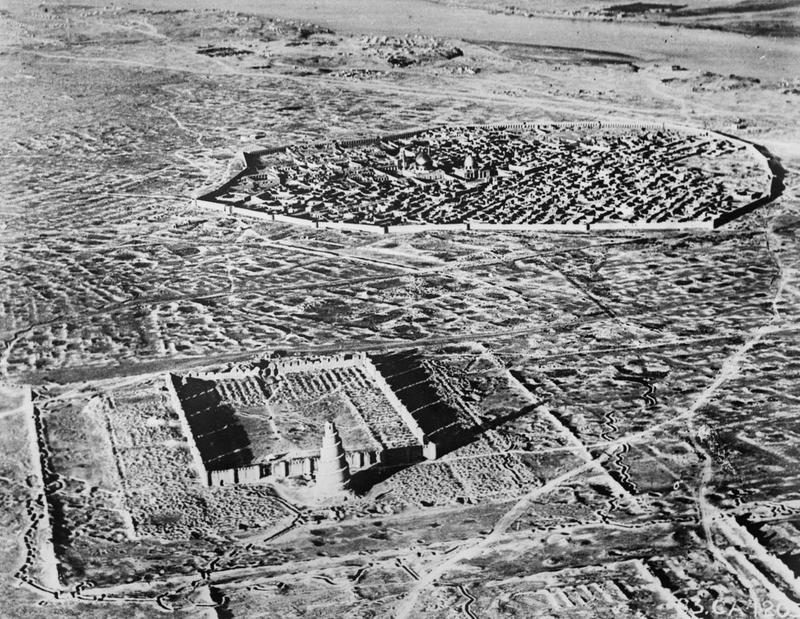
Samarra during the early 20th century

Samarra first drew the attention of archeologists around the turn of the 20th century, and excavation work was conducted by Henri Viollet, Friedrich Sarre, and Ernst Herzfeld in the period leading up to World War I. Aerial photographs were taken between 1924 and 1961, which preserved portions of the site that have since been overrun by new development. The Directorate-General of Antiquities of Iraq restarted excavations between 1936 and 1940, and continued in the 1960s and 1970s. Excavation and restoration work took place between 1980 and 1990. Around the same time, Alastair Northedge surveyed the surviving portions of the city, and has since published several works on the subject. Despite these projects, an estimated 80% of the site was still unexcavated around the beginning of the 21st century.

Developments in the 20th century, including the completion of the Samarra Barrage in the 1950s and growth of the modern city of Samarra, have resulted in parts of the ruins being overrun by new construction and cultivation. The Iraq War (2003–2011) also caused damage to the site, including in 2005 when a bomb was detonated at the top of the minaret of the Great Mosque. The palace complex of Sur Ashinas was the site of fighting between the Islamic State of Iraq and the Levant and the Iraqi Army and tribal militias during the ISIL offensive in Iraq in 2015.

The Samarra Archaeological City was declared a World Heritage Site by UNESCO in 2007. The agency regards Samarra as the only remaining Islamic capital that retains its original plan, architecture, and carvings. The site fulfilled several of UNESCO's criteria for the list. Though poorly preserved, the city's historic mosques, urban planning, architectural ornaments, and ceramic industries are uniquely representative of a particular architectural stage in the Abbasid Caliphate, which extended from Tunisia to Central Asia (criteria ii and iii). Its historic mosques present a unique style of Islamic architecture, evident in their large dimensions and unique minarets (criteria iv).
