= Ja'far ibn Muhammad ibn Ammar al-Burjumi =

Chief Qadi (qadi al-qudat) of Abbasid Caliphate

Ja'far ibn Muhammad ibn Ammar al-Burjumi جعفر بن محمد بن عمار البرجمي

Chief Judge of the Abbasid Caliphate
- In office 863/4 – 866; Caliph: al-Musta'in

Personal life
- Born: unknown date Abbasid Caliphate
- Died: 866; Abbasid Caliphate
- Parent: Muhammad ibn Ammar al-Burjumi
- Era: Islamic Golden Age
- Region: Abbasid Caliphate
- Main interest(s): Aqidah, (Islamic theology), Tawhid, Islamic jurisprudence

Religious life
- Religion: Islam
- Creed: Sunni

Ja'far ibn Muhammad ibn Ammar al-Burjumi (Arabic: جعفر بن محمد بن عمار البرجمي) (died 866) was a chief judge (qadi al-qudat) of the Abbasid Caliphate.

Described as a member of a family originally from Kufa, he served as judge of Wasit before being appointed to the Kufan judiciary in 849/50 as replacement to the Mihna-era qadi Ghassan ibn Muhammad al-Marwazi. In 863 or 864 he was elevated to the chief judgeship by the Caliph al-Musta'in, and held that position until his death in 866.

== See also ==
- Ja'far ibn Abd al-Wahid ibn Ja'far al-Hashimi
- Yahya ibn Aktham
- Ibn Qutaybah
