= Umm al-Kitab =

Umm al-Kitab (Arabic: أمّ الکتاب, romanized: umm al-kitāb, lit. 'mother of the Book') is an Islam-related term that may refer to:

- Umm al-Kitab (Shi'i book), a syncretic Shi'i work originating in ghulāt circles and preserved in the Isma'ili tradition
- al-Fatiha, the first Surah of the Quran, also referred to as Umm al-Kitab or Umm al-Qur'an
- Heavenly Quran, known in Arabic as Umm al-Kitab
