= Muhammad ibn Ahmad ibn Abi Du'ad =

Abbasid acting Chief Judge (848–850)

Muhammad ibn Ahmad ibn Abi Du'ad محمد بن أحمد بن أبي دعد Al-Iyadi

Chief Judge of the Abbasid Caliphate
- In office 848 – 850; Caliph: al-Mutawakkil
- Preceded by: Ahmad ibn Abi Du'ad
- Succeeded by: Yahya ibn Aktham

Personal life
- Born: Muhammad (birth name); 820s Basra, Abbasid Caliphate
- Died: May/June 854 Basra, Abbasid Caliphate (present-day Iraq)
- Parent: Ahmad ibn Abi Du'ad
- Citizenship: Caliphate
- Era: Islamic Golden Age
- Main interest(s): Islamic theology, Islamic jurisprudence
- Known for: A proponent of Ahmad ibn Abi Du'ad's Muʿtazila, He was appointed as chief judge of the Abbasid Caliphate in 848, he tried to maintain his position in Abbasid court however he was unsuccessful.
- Relations: Iyad (tribe)

Religious life
- Religion: Islam
- Jurisprudence: Hanafi
- Creed: Muʿtazila

Muhammad ibn Ahmad ibn Abi Du'ad (Arabic: محمد بن أحمد بن أبي دعد, death 854) was an acting chief judge (qadi) of the mid-ninth century. A proponent of Ahmad ibn Abi Du'ad's Mu'tazili views, he was an acting chief judge of the Abbasid Caliphate in 848, however he was not influential and was merely a puppet of the Abbasid caliph al-Mutawakkil.

== Background ==
Muhammad was the son of Ahmad ibn Abi Du'ad, who was an Islamic religious judge (qadi) of the mid-ninth century. A proponent of Mu'tazilism, he was appointed as chief judge of the Abbasid Caliphate in 833, and became highly influential during the caliphates of al-Mu'tasim and al-Wathiq. During his tenure as chief judge he sought to maintain Mu'tazilism as the official ideology of the state, and he played a leading role in prosecuting the Inquisition (mihnah) to ensure compliance with Mu'tazilite doctrines among officials and scholars.

Al-Mutawakkil's reign (r. 847–861) marked a significant break with the policies of al-Mu'tasim and al-Wathiq. The new caliph was determined to eliminate the officials who had played a dominant role in the governments of his two predecessors, and in the first years of his rule he succeeded in killing or removing from power the majority of these men, including Ibn al-Zayyat and the chamberlain Itakh. Al-Mutawakkil also decided to diverge away from the religious policies of the previous caliphs, opting instead to put a stop to the controversy over whether the Qur'an was created or uncreated. Although he was not a partisan of the traditionalist party, he gradually abandoned Mu'tazilism and suspended the mihnah, ultimately putting an end to the doctrinal regime that had been in place since 833.

== Appointment ==
The new caliph initially took no action against Ahmad ibn Abi Du'ad, who continued to appoint qadis to provincial cities. Less than a year after al-Mutawakkil's accession, however, the chief judge suffered a debilitating stroke that left him partially paralyzed, and his son Muhammad was forced to take up the actual discharge of his duties. Muhammad proved to be less influential than his father, and the family's standing declined as al-Mutawakkil spent the next several years taking hostile steps against the Mu'tazilites, dismissing a number of Ibn Abi Du'ad's qadis from office and ordering an end to debate over the nature of the Qur'an.

== Dismissal and Imprisonment ==
In late 851, al-Mutawakkil decided to completely remove Ibn Abi Du'ad from power and stripped Muhammad of his positions in the mazalim courts. He also ordered that the estates of Ibn Abi Du'ad and his family to be seized and liquidated, and Muhammad and his brothers were placed into prison. At the same time, the caliph took steps to definitively end the mihnah. In place of Ibn Abi Du'ad, Yahya ibn Aktham was re-appointed as chief judge, while several more of Ibn Abi Du'ad's qadis were dismissed. The caliph also attempted to reconcile with Ahmad ibn Hanbal and removed Ahmad ibn Nasr's body from public display, and finally, in March 852, he ordered that all prisoners held on account of the Inquisition be released, thereby largely bringing a close to the mihnah period.

== Death ==
His father, Ibn Abi Du'ad survived for only three years after the loss of the (nominal) chief judgeship. He died in June 854, twenty days after the death of Muhammad.

== Sources ==
- Hinds, M. (1993). "Mihna". The Encyclopedia of Islam, New Edition, Volume VII: Mif–Naz. Leiden and New York: BRILL. pp. 2–6. ISBN 90-04-09419-9.
- Ibn Khallikan, Shams al-Din Abu al-'Abbas Ahmad ibn Muhammad (1871). Ibn Khallikan's Biographical Dictionary, Vol. IV. Trans. Baron Mac Guckin de Slane. Paris: Oriental Translation Fund of Great Britain and Ireland.
- Melchert, Christopher (1996). "Religious Policies of the Caliphs from al-Mutawakkil to al-Muqtadir: AH 232-295/AD 847-908". Islamic Law and Society. 3 (3): 316–342. doi:10.1163/1568519962599069. JSTOR 3399413.
- Al-Tabari, Abu Ja'far Muhammad ibn Jarir (1985–2007). Ehsan Yar-Shater (ed.). The History of Al-Ṭabarī. Vol. 40 vols. Albany, NY: State University of New York Press.
- Turner, John P. (2010). "The End of the Mihna". Oriens. 38: 89–106. doi:10.1163/187783710X536671.
- Zetterstéen, K. V.; Pellat, Ch. (1960). "Ahmad b. Abi Du'ad". The Encyclopedia of Islam, New Edition, Volume I: A–B. Leiden and New York: BRILL. p. 271. ISBN 90-04-08114-3.
- Kennedy, Hugh (2004). The Prophet and the Age of the Caliphates: The Islamic Near East from the Sixth to the Eleventh Century (Second ed.). Harlow: Pearson Longman. ISBN 0-582-40525-4.

Preceded by Ahmad ibn Abi Du'ad	Chief judge of the Abbasid Caliphate (Acting); 848–850	Succeeded by Yahya ibn Aktham
