= Ahmad ibn Abi Du'ad =

Abbasid official and Chief Judge

Ahmad ibn Abi Du'ad أحمد بن أبي دؤاد Al-Iyadi

Chief Judge of the Abbasid Caliphate
- In office 833–848
- Preceded by: Yahya ibn Aktham
- Succeeded by: Muhammad ibn Ahmad

Abbasid Official and Adviser
- In office 833–847

Personal life
- Born: Ahmad (birth name) c. 776/7 Basra, Abbasid Caliphate
- Died: June 854 Basra, Abbasid Caliphate (present-day Iraq)
- Children: Abdullah ibn Ahmad, Muhammad ibn Ahmad
- Parent: Abi Du'ad al-Iyadi
- Era: Islamic Golden Age
- Region: Abbasid Caliphate
- Main interest(s): Islamic theology, Islamic jurisprudence
- Notable work(s): During his tenure as chief judge he sought to maintain Mu'tazilism as the official ideology of the state, and he played a leading role in prosecuting the Inquisition (Mihnah) to ensure compliance with Muʿtazila doctrines among officials and scholars.
- Known for: A proponent Muʿtazila, He was appointed as chief judge of the Abbasid Caliphate in 833, and became highly influential during the reign of al-Mu'tasim and al-Wathiq.
- Relations: Iyad (tribe)

Religious life
- Religion: Islam
- Denomination: Muʿtazila

Abu 'Abdallah Ahmad ibn Abi Du'ad al-Iyadi (Arabic: أبو عبد الله أحمد بن أبي دؤاد الإيادي, romanized: ʾAbū ʿAbd Allāh ʾAḥmad ibn ʾAbī Duʾād al-ʾIyādī) (776/7–June 854) was an Islamic religious judge (qadi) of the mid-ninth century. A proponent of Mu'tazilism, he was appointed as chief judge of the Abbasid Caliphate in 833, and became highly influential during the caliphates of al-Mu'tasim and al-Wathiq. During his tenure as chief judge he sought to maintain Mu'tazilism as the official ideology of the state, and he played a leading role in prosecuting the Inquisition (mihnah) to ensure compliance with Mu'tazilite doctrines among officials and scholars. In 848 Ibn Abi Du'ad suffered a stroke and transferred his position to his son Muhammad, but his family's influence declined during the caliphate of al-Mutawakkil, who gradually abandoned Mu'tazilism and put an end to the mihnah.

As one of the most senior officials during the reigns of several caliphs, Ibn Abi Du'ad's stature at the Abbasid court has been compared with that of the Barmakids at their height. Considered a leading Mu'tazilite and one of the chief architects of the mihnah, his persecution of orthodox scholars, including the famed theologian Ahmad ibn Hanbal, caused his reputation to suffer after his death, and he was made into an object of vilification by later Sunni biographers.

== Early career ==
Born in Basra in 776 or 777, Ibn Abi Du'ad belonged to an Arab family that originated from a village near Qinnasrin in northern Syria and which belonged to the Adnanite tribe of Iyad, although the latter claim was later contested by Ibn Abi Du'ad's enemies. Early in his life he moved to Damascus with his father, and he spent his youth learning Islamic jurisprudence (fiqh) and scholastic theology (kalam). His teacher Hayyaj ibn al-'Ala' al-Sulami had formerly been a pupil of Wasil ibn 'Ata', the founder of Mu'tazilism, and under his tutelage Ibn Abi Du'ad became an advocate of Mu'tazilite doctrines.

Following the completion of his studies, Ibn Abi Du'ad became affiliated with Yahya ibn Aktham, the chief judge (qadi al-qudat) under the caliph al-Ma'mun (r. 813–833). It was while in Yahya's service that he first met al-Ma'mun – according to one anecdote, this occurred as early as the year of al-Ma'mun's arrival in Baghdad in 819 – and he quickly found favor with the caliph. Al-Ma'mun was himself inclined toward Mu'tazilism, which represented a moderate alternative between orthodoxy and the Alids while simultaneously affirming his authority as imam to preside over religious matters, and in 827 he proclaimed his belief in a central Mu'tazilite tenet, that the Qur'an had been created. By the end of al-Ma'mun's reign in 833, Ibn Abi Du'ad had become a close associate of the caliph, and on his deathbed al-Ma'mun recommended to his brother and successor al-Mu'tasim that he admit Ibn Abi Du'ad to his circle of advisors.

== Chief judge under al-Mu'tasim ==
Following the accession of al-Mu'tasim, the new caliph followed his brother's advice by appointing Ibn Abi Du'ad as chief judge, replacing the latter's erstwhile patron Yahya ibn Aktham. During al-Mu'tasim's reign (r. 833–842), Ibn Abi Du'ad wielded enormous political and economic influence, and the caliph was said to be completely under his power, with neither his public or private business done without his advice. He became one of the senior officials of the state, although he was forced to contend with the vizier Muhammad ibn al-Zayyat, who became his chief rival in the administration.

Map showing prominent cities where the mihnah took place

During the reign of al-Mu'tasim, Mu'tazilism was maintained as the official creed of the state. Although the caliph reportedly lacked al-Ma'mun's personal zeal for Mu'tazilism, he nevertheless continued his brother's religious policies, allegedly due to the influence of Ibn Abi Du'ad. To ensure compliance with the doctrine of the created Qur'an, the chief judge continued the Inquisition or mihnah. Initiated by al-Ma'mun just four months before his death, the mihnah required officials, judges and scholars to be tested on their beliefs regarding the nature of the Qur'an; individuals who refused to adhere to the position that it had been created were subject to dismissal, arrest or torture. Among the victims of the mihnah during this period was Ahmad ibn Hanbal, the founder of the Hanbali school of jurisprudence, who was tried by Ibn Abi Du'ad and flogged for maintaining his orthodox beliefs. Ibn Abi Du'ad also oversaw the appointment of several like-minded qadis to various cities throughout the empire, who similarly prosecuted the mihnah within their respective jurisdictions.

Outside of his overseeing of the mihnah, Ibn Abi Du'ad spent his time at court developing a reputation for moderation and compassion, interceding on several occasions to save individuals who had become subject to al-Mu'tasim's wrath from punishment and securing favors from the caliph for various patrons. At the same time, he came to play an important role in the fiscal affairs of the caliphate, his staff overseeing, for example, the division of spoils during the Amorium campaign in 838; he is also said to have pushed through an irrigation canal project in Khurasan, and following a large fire in Baghdad he was able to convince the caliph to entrust him with distributing five million dirhams for the relief of the citizens there. Ibn Abi Du'ad additionally took part in the move to the new capital of Samarra in 836, where he received a land allotment in the central city, and in 840 he presided over the heresy trial of the disgraced general al-Afshin.

== Under al-Wathiq ==
Ibn Abi Du'ad remained influential under al-Mu'tasim's son and successor al-Wathiq (r. 842–847), who similarly maintained the doctrine that the Qur'an had been created. For the majority of al-Mu'tasim's reign, the mihnah had generally been only lightly enforced, although Ibn Abi Du'ad and his allied qadis had escalated their activities in the last year of the caliph's life. With the accession of al-Wathiq, however, the new caliph ordered that the severity of the mihnah be increased, giving advocates of the inquisition approval to proceed with vigor. At the beginning of al-Wathiq's reign, Ibn Abi Du'ad appointed several new qadis to Baghdad who supported the mihnah, and in the provinces there was a marked increase of persecutions against individuals who were considered dissenters. In 845 the mihnah was even extended to Muslim prisoners held by the Byzantines, when Ibn Abi Du'ad sent an agent to test their opinion on Qur'anic createdness and ransomed only those who supported it, leaving those who did not in Byzantine custody.

Al-Wathiq's continued adherence to the belief of the created Qur'an eventually prompted a traditionalist backlash, which manifested itself in 846 as a planned popular revolt in Baghdad. The plot was discovered ahead of time, however, and its ringleader Ahmad ibn Nasr al-Khuza'i was arrested and sent to al-Wathiq in Samarra, where he was questioned on his beliefs regarding the nature of the Qur'an. Ahmad's statements during the interrogation enraged al-Wathiq, and despite Ibn Abi Du'ad's reluctance to have him killed the prisoner was personally executed by the caliph and his soldiers. The public death of Ahmad only further increased populist agitation in Baghdad against the caliph's religious policy, and Ahmad was soon turned into a martyr by supporters of orthodoxy.

Under al-Wathiq, the rivalry between Ibn Abi Du'ad and the vizier Ibn al-Zayyat continued. During a general crackdown against the state bureaucracy in 843-4, Ibn al-Zayyat took action against the chief judge and other court of complaint (mazalim) officials, who were investigated and imprisoned as a result. Their cases were presided over by Ishaq ibn Ibrahim al-Mus'abi, and they were publicly displayed and treated in a harsh manner.

== Downfall and death ==
Following the death of al-Wathiq in 847, Ibn Abi Du'ad formed a council with Ibn al-Zayyat and other senior officials to determine who should succeed the caliph, eventually settling on al-Wathiq's brother Ja'far. Ibn Abi Du'ad gave the nominee the regnal title of al-Mutawakkil, and the latter was accordingly invested with the caliphate.

Al-Mutawakkil's reign (r. 847–861) marked a significant break with the policies of al-Mu'tasim and al-Wathiq. The new caliph was determined to eliminate the officials who had played a dominant role in the governments of his two predecessors, and in the first years of his rule he succeeded in killing or removing from power the majority of these men, including Ibn al-Zayyat and the chamberlain Itakh. Al-Mutawakkil also decided to diverge away from the religious policies of the previous caliphs, opting instead to put a stop to the controversy over whether the Qur'an was created or uncreated. Although he was not a partisan of the traditionalist party, he gradually abandoned Mu'tazilism and suspended the mihnah, ultimately putting an end to the doctrinal regime that had been in place since 833.

The new caliph initially took no action against Ibn Abi Du'ad, who continued to appoint qadis to provincial cities. Less than a year after al-Mutawakkil's accession, however, the chief judge suffered a debilitating stroke that left him partially paralyzed, and his son Muhammad was forced to take up the actual discharge of his duties. Muhammad proved to be less influential than his father, and the family's standing declined as al-Mutawakkil spent the next several years taking hostile steps against the Mu'tazilites, dismissing a number of Ibn Abi Du'ad's qadis from office and ordering an end to debate over the nature of the Qur'an.

In late 851, al-Mutawakkil decided to completely remove Ibn Abi Du'ad from power and stripped Muhammad of his positions in the mazalim courts. He also ordered that the estates of Ibn Abi Du'ad and his family to be seized and liquidated, and Muhammad and his brothers were placed into prison. At the same time, the caliph took steps to definitively end the mihnah. In place of Ibn Abi Du'ad, Yahya ibn Aktham was re-appointed as chief judge, while several more of Ibn Abi Du'ad's qadis were dismissed. The caliph also attempted to reconcile with Ahmad ibn Hanbal and removed Ahmad ibn Nasr's body from public display, and finally, in March 852, he ordered that all prisoners held on account of the Inquisition be released, thereby largely bringing a close to the mihnah period.

Ibn Abi Du'ad survived for only three years after the loss of the chief judgeship. He died in June 854, twenty days after the death of his son Muhammad.

== Legacy and assessment ==
With the political decline of Mu'tazilism and the victory of orthodoxy, Ibn Abi Du'ad was criticised for his doctrinal beliefs and the prosecution of the mihnah. Sunni writers often made no attempt to conceal their hostility toward him, and passed severe judgement on his tenure in office. The trial and flogging of Ahmad ibn Hanbal in 834-5, in which Ibn Abi Du'ad played a major role, was particularly condemned. Ahmad himself is quoted as having remarked that Ibn Abi Du'ad was a "disbeliever of God Almighty (kafirun bi'llah al-'azim)" and "the most ignorant of people in knowledge ('ilm) and theology (kalam)," and later sources portrayed Ahmad as heroically defending the traditionalist cause in the face of an ignorant bigot. Individuals associated with Ibn Abi Du'ad also occasionally faced discrimination after his death, as when the caliph al-Mu'tazz (r. 866–869) cancelled the appointments of eight men as qadis and exiled them to Baghdad upon learning that they had been followers of the former judge.

While condemned for his religious policies and activities, Ibn Abi Du'ad was simultaneously praised by the sources for his tolerant and humane nature, along with his learning and magnanimity. Numerous anecdotes consistently portray the chief judge as a man of compromise and generosity, and he is frequently shown as intervening to resolve disputes between the caliphs and their opponents in an effort to prevent bloodshed. He was also known as a competent poet, and was a patron of various poets and literary men. He particularly was associated with the fellow Mu'tazilite and author al-Jahiz, who dedicated at least one of his works to him and provided him with theological arguments to use against the traditionalists.

More recently, some modern scholars have argued that Ibn Abi Du'ad's role in maintaining the mihnah under al-Mu'tasim and al-Wathiq may have been overstated by the sources. Tayeb el-Hibri believed that with the gradual rehabilitation of orthodoxy to the caliphate following the abandonment of Mu'tazilism, orthodox traditionalists became less inclined to discuss the role of the caliphs in fostering the mihnah; as a result, the caliphs were re-imagined as reluctant supporters or even outright opponents of Mu'tazilism and the Inquisition, and the blame for these was instead shifted to Ibn Abi Du'ad. Muhammad Qasim Zaman, who characterized the chief judge as a "much maligned figure" in Sunni sources, likewise saw the portrayal of al-Mu'tasim and al-Wathiq as halfheartedly continuing the policies of al-Ma'mun as a narrative pushed by traditionalists in an attempt to de-legitimize the mihnah. By making the Inquisition the product of a subordinate official rather than of the caliphs themselves, supporters of orthodoxy hoped to prove the moral bankruptcy of the affair and mitigate the culpability of the caliphs.

== See also ==
- Yahya ibn Aktham

== Notes ==
Preceded by Yahya ibn Aktham	Chief judge of the Abbasid Caliphate; 833–848	Succeeded by Muhammad ibn Ahmad ibn Abi Du'ad (Acting)
