= Yahya ibn Aktham =

Chief Qadi of the Abbasid Caliphate

Yahya ibn Aktham يحيى بن أكثم

Judge (Qadi) of Basra
- In office 817 or 818 – 825; Caliph: al-Ma'mun

Chief Judge of the Abbasid Caliphate
- In office 825 – 833; Caliph: al-Ma'mun
- Succeeded by: Ahmad ibn Abi Du'ad

Chief Judge of the Abbasid Caliphate
- In office 851 – 854; Caliph: al-Mutawakkil
- Succeeded by: Ja'far ibn Abd al-Wahid ibn Ja'far al-Hashimi

Personal life
- Born: Merv, Abbasid Caliphate
- Died: April 857 Al-Rabadha, Abbasid Caliphate (now Saudi Arabia)
- Parent: Aktham
- Era: Islamic Golden Age
- Region: Abbasid Caliphate
- Main interest: Islamic jurisprudence
- Known for: Participation in al-Ma'mun's campaign against the Byzantines and was put in command of a raiding party which set out from Tyana in 831

Religious life
- Religion: Islam
- Denomination: Sunni
- Jurisprudence: Hanafi

Muslim leader
- Influenced by: Sufyan al-Thawri, Waki' ibn al-Jarrah

Abu Muhammad Yahya ibn Aktham (Arabic: أبو محمد يحيى بن أكثم, died 857) was a ninth century Arab Islamic jurist. He twice served as the chief judge of the Abbasid Caliphate, from ca. 825 to 833 and 851 to 854.

== Career ==
Yahya was born in Marw in Khurasan and was a member of the Banu Tamim; he himself claimed descent from the judge Aktham ibn Sayfi. He studied hadith and fiqh in Basra. In 817-8 he was appointed as qadi (judge) of Basra, and he held that position until 825.

Following his dismissal from Basra, Yahya was selected by al-Ma'mun (r. 813–833) to serve as chief justice (qadi al-qudat). Yahya enjoyed strong relations with the caliph and became an immensely influential member of the administration, with all decisions made by the viziers being reportedly submitted to him for approval first. In 831 he participated in al-Ma'mun's campaign against the Byzantines and was put in command of a raiding party which set out from Tyana, and in the following year he accompanied the caliph to Egypt and briefly acted as judge there.

By the end of al-Ma'mun's reign, however, Yahya had fallen out of favor, and he decided to return to Iraq. Throughout his career he had been forced to defend himself against consistent allegations of pederasty, and by the time of al-Ma'mun's death he was also facing accusations of financial mismanagement. As a supporter of Sunni orthodoxy, he was also opposed to the Mu'tazilite belief that the Qur'an had been created, which put him at odds with the caliph's adherence to Mu'tazilism. Following the accession of al-Ma'mun's brother al-Mu'tasim (r. 833–842), Yahya lost his position and was replaced with the Mu'tazilite Ahmad ibn Abi Du'ad.

In 851, following the abandonment of Mu'tazilism by al-Mutawakkil (r. 847–861), Yahya was again made chief judge and he moved to Samarra. During his judgeship he appointed a mix of qadis, selecting both men who had formerly been affiliated with Mu'tazilism, as well as those who appealed to the orthodox Hanbalis. He remained chief judge until July 854, when al-Mutawakkil dismissed him in favor of Ja'far ibn Abd al-Wahid ibn Ja'far al-Hashimi. His money and land were also seized at the time of his dismissal, and he was placed under house arrest.

In 857 Yahya decided to go on the pilgrimage and intended to take up residence in Mecca. Upon learning that al-Mutawakkil had forgiven him, he changed his mind and set out to return to Iraq, but he died on the journey in April 857 and was buried in al-Rabadhah.

== Jurisprudence ==
He is generally characterised as having been affiliated with the Hanafis, and many state this without specifying his teacher in Fiqh. However some do state that he learnt from Waki' ibn al-Jarrah in particular, who would give juridical opinions on the position of Abu Hanifah, and that he also related Hadith reports from one of Abu Hanifa's main students, Muhammad al-Shaybani. Ibn Hazm's view is that he was part of an independent Basran Ra'y tradition that was later subsumed by the Hanafi school. Al-Daraqutni further alternatively lists him as a Shafi'i but this is doubted by primary sources.

He was also the one of the early jurist who permitted to have female homosexual relation.

== Notes ==
Preceded by Ali ibn Harmalah al-Taymi	Chief judge of the Abbasid Caliphate ca. 825–833	Succeeded by Ahmad ibn Abi Du'ad
Preceded by Muhammad ibn Ahmad ibn Abi Du'ad (Acting)	Chief judge of the Abbasid Caliphate; 851–854	Succeeded by Ja'far ibn Abd al-Wahid ibn Ja'far al-Hashimi
