= Ja'far ibn Abd al-Wahid ibn Ja'far al-Hashimi =

Chief Qadi of Abbasid Caliphate

Ja'far ibn Abd al-Wahid ibn Ja'far ibn Sulayman ibn Ali al-Hashimi جعفر بن عبد الواحد بن جعفر بن سليمان بن علي الهاشمي

Chief Judge of the Abbasid Caliphate
- In office 854–863/4
- Preceded by: Yahya ibn Aktham
- Succeeded by: Ja'far ibn Muhammad

Personal life
- Born: Abbasid Caliphate
- Died: 871/2, 881/2 or 882/3
- Parent: Abd al-Wahid ibn Ja'far ibn Sulayman ibn Ali al-Hashimi
- Era: Islamic Golden Age
- Region: Abbasid Caliphate
- Main interest(s): Aqidah, (Islamic theology), Tawhid, Islamic jurisprudence
- Known for: Participation in the Arab–Byzantine prisoner exchange of 856. Leading the funeral prayers of the caliph al-Muhtadi in 870.
- Relations: Abbasid dynasty

Religious life
- Religion: Islam

Abu Abdallah Ja'far ibn Abd al-Wahid ibn Ja'far ibn Sulayman ibn Ali al-Hashimi (Arabic: أبو عبد الله جعفر بن عبد الواحد بن جعفر بن سليمان بن علي الهاشمي) (died 871/2?) was a Chief judge of the Abbasid Caliphate, from 854 to 863/4.

He was a minor member of the Abbasid dynasty, being a descendant of Sulayman ibn Ali, the uncle of the caliphs al-Saffah and al-Mansur. Although his jurisdictional background is obscure, he was appointed as chief judge (qadi al-qudat) by al-Mutawakkil in July 854 as a replacement for Yahya ibn Aktham. His tenure in office is notable for his participation in the Arab–Byzantine prisoner exchange of 856, during which al-Hasan ibn Muhammad ibn Abi al-Shawarib acted as his deputy in Samarra. He remained in office until 863 or 864, when he was dismissed and exiled to Basra after the general Wasif al-Turki accused him of engaging with the shakiriyya troops in a suspicious manner. He was eventually allowed to return to the capital, where in 866 he unsuccessfully attempted to settle a violent dispute between the Turkish and Maghariba army regiments. In 870 he led the prayers at the funeral of the caliph al-Muhtadi. He died in 871/2, or in 881/2 or 882/3 according to alternative accounts.

== See also ==
- Al-Ḫaṣṣāf

== Notes ==
Preceded by Yahya ibn Aktham	Chief judge of the Abbasid Caliphate; 854–863/4	Succeeded by Ja'far ibn Muhammad ibn Ammar al-Burjumi
