= Heavenly Quran =

Archetype of the revealed Quran in Islamic theology

The Heavenly Quran (Arabic: أمّ الکتاب, romanized: umm al-kitāb, lit. 'mother of the Book'), according to a common Islamic belief, is a primordial version of the revealed Quran.

== History ==
The idea of a holy book or other religious totem being based on an archetype preserved in heaven is not unique to Islam but goes back "thousands of years" to "the early Sumerians" according to Alfred Guillaume.

=== In the revealed Quran ===
Quranic verses 43:4 and 13:39 referred to “mother of the book” (umm al-kitab); verse 85:22 refers to a “well-guarded tablet” (lawh mahfuz) and 56:78 to a “concealed book” (kitab maknun). Revelation of the Quran is described as being "sent down" in verse 17:105:

"With the truth we (God) have sent it down and with the truth it has come down".

It is also called kalam allah — the word of God — and to most Muslims is eternal and uncreated attribute of God, as opposed to something written or created by God. The Quran that resides in heaven is distinct from the earthly Quran. It is disputed whether the revealed Quran is a precise copy of the Heavenly Quran or an abridged version. Commonly, the Injil and the Islamic notion of Torah are thought to be part of the Heavenly Quran.

== See also ==
- Quranic createdness
