= Palermo Quran =

Dispersed tenth-century manuscript of the Quran

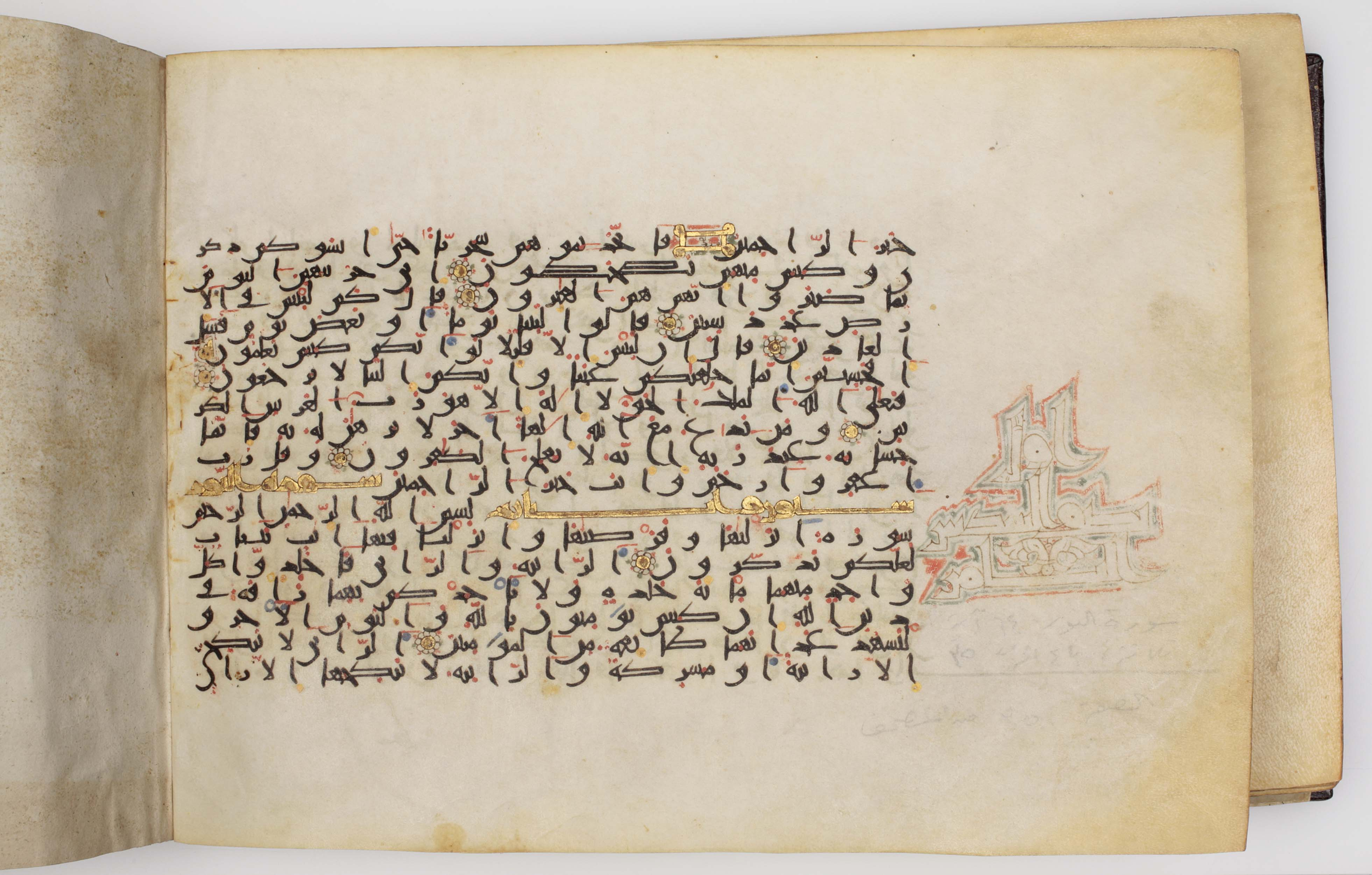
- One of the folios from the Khalili Collection
- Date: 983 AD
- Place of origin: Palermo, Italy
- Language: Arabic
- Size: 277 pages
- Exemplar: Quran

The Palermo Quran is a manuscript of the Quran written in Palermo, Sicily in AH 372 (982 or 983 CE) when Sicily was part of the Fatimid Caliphate. It is the oldest surviving Quran manuscript from Muslim Sicily and has been described by University of Oxford professor Jeremy Johns as "the single most important artifact so far known to survive from Muslim Sicily".

Most of the manuscript is located in the library of the Nuruosmaniye Mosque in Istanbul (inventory number Ms. 23). Two quires (bound groups of folios) are in the Khalili Collection of Islamic Art (QUR 261 and QUR 368) and a further two quires are missing.

== Physical description ==
The manuscript originally consisted of 29 quires totalling 277 parchment folios. The two quires in the Khalili Collection constitute folios 149 to 168 of the complete manuscript. The fate of the remaining two quires (folios 99 to 118) is unknown. The folios measure 250 millimetres (9.8 in) by 176 millimetres (6.9 in) and have been cropped from a larger size at some point.

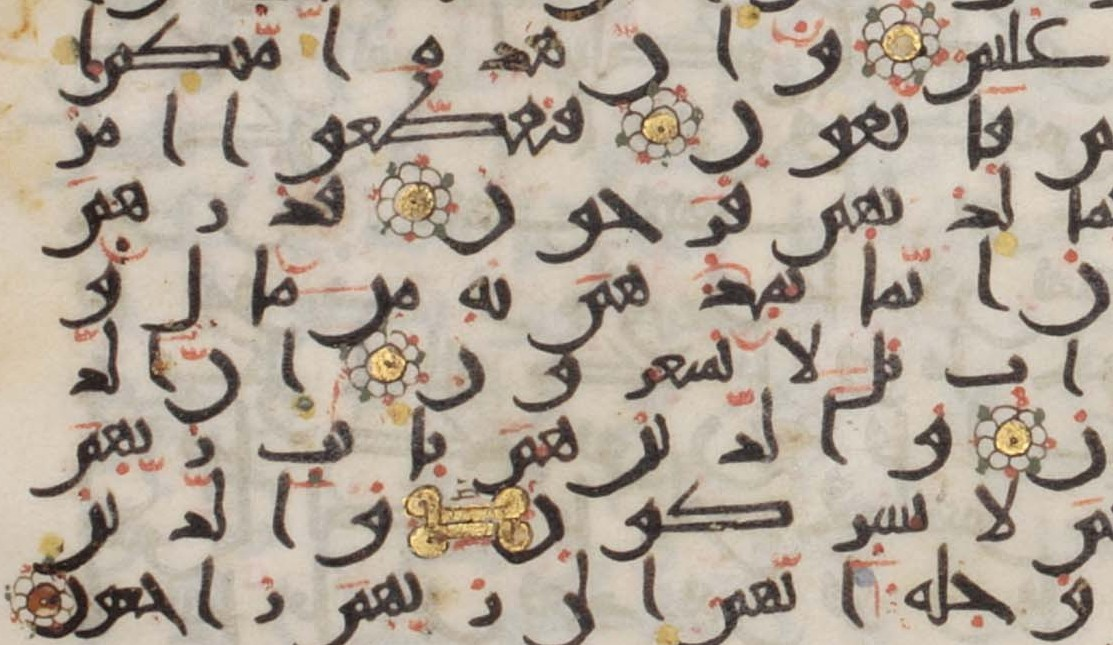
Detail showing verse and vocalisation markings in ink and gold

The text box, containing seventeen lines of Kufic script with vocalisation markings, takes up a small proportion of each folio. There are occasional illuminations. Rosettes with gold surrounded by red and green dots are used as verse markers. Gold is also used in surah headings and illuminations. Although the manuscript is restrained in its use of gold compared to other Qurans from the era, it is unusually colourful with its use of yellow, blue, red, and green ink in addition to the black text. The decorative motifs resemble painted inscriptions at the Great Mosque of Kairouan in Tunisia.

The manuscript bears the stamps of Ottoman sultans Bayezid II and Osman III. Osman III was sultan when the manuscript was rebound in the mid-eighteenth century. The text block has a goatskin binding dating from the mid-fifteenth century which Jeremy Johns describes as "almost certainly made for Mehmed the Conqueror".

== Significance ==
Although it dates from the late tenth century CE, the Palermo Quran shares stylistic and material features with Quran manuscripts from the eighth and ninth centuries, including the use of parchment rather than paper. It thus illustrates the conservatism of Western Islamic culture.

Ways of reading the Quran aloud are known as qiraʼat. The two major qiraʼat are the Warsh recitation associated with Medina and the Hafs recitation associated with Kufa in Iraq. The Palermo Quran's markings indicate the Warsh recitation, so it is physical evidence of that qiraʼa's emergence as the new standard in the tenth century, and the growing influence of Medina in the Islamic world.

A four-line vignette on the second folio includes the shahada (the Islamic statement of faith) followed by a statement that "the Quran is the Speech of God and is not created". This is unusual for multiple reasons. The createdness of the Quran (whether the text of the Quran was created at a specific time or has always existed) was a subject of Islamic theological debate. In the Fatimid caliphate, the dominant position was that the Quran was Muhammad's verbal expression of a divine message and so was created in a specific time and place. The Palermo Quran very prominently expresses an opposing opinion: that the Quran is eternal and was never created. Before the twelfth century, it was very unusual for a Quran to include a statement on the issue of createdness, especially on the same folio as the shahada.
