= Quranic createdness =

Islamic doctrinal position that the Quran was created

In Islamic theology, createdness of the Quran (Arabic: خلق القرآن, romanized: khalq al-qurʾān) is the doctrinal position that the Quran was created rather than having always existed (thus being "uncreated").

One of the main areas of debate in aqida (Muslim theology) was the divine attribute of kalam (lit. word, speech) revealing itself through wahy (revelation). Kalam is a counterpart to 'aql (Greek logos, "word", and thus "reason"). If the aql was part of God's essence or nature, then the Quran must therefore not be created. On the other hand, the Quran is written in Arabic (human speech) in the Arabic script, neither of which is eternal.

The dispute over which position was factual became a significant point of contention in early Islam. The rationalist philosophical school known as the Mu'tazilites are best known for their belief that the Qur'an is God's "created" word, instead of pre-existing with God himself since eternity. The Jahmites negated all the attributes of God, and believed that God could not speak, hence the Quran was not the literal word of God. It was instead a metaphor for his will.

In the Muslim world today, Sunni Muslims argue that the Quran is uncreated while Shia Muslims argue for the createdness of the Quran.

== History ==
The controversy over the doctrine in the Abbasid Caliphate came to a head during the reign of Caliph al-Ma'mun. In 827 CE, al-Ma'mun publicly adopted the doctrine of createdness, and six years later instituted an inquisition known as the mihna ("test, ordeal") to "ensure acquiescence in this doctrine". The mihna continued during the reigns of Caliphs al-Mu'tasim and al-Wathiq, and during the early reign of al-Mutawakkil. Those who did not accept that the Qur’an is created were punished, imprisoned, or even killed.

According to Sunni tradition, when "tested", traditionist Ahmad ibn Hanbal refused to accept the doctrine of createdness despite two years imprisonment and being scourged until unconscious. Eventually, due to Ahmad ibn Hanbal's determination, Caliph al-Mutawakkil released him and the Mu'tazila doctrine was silenced for a time. In the years thereafter in the Abbasid state, it was the minority of Muslims who believed in Quranic createdness who were on the receiving end of the sword or lash.

The influential scholar al-Tabari (d.923) declared in his aqidah (creed) that (in the words of Islamic historian Michael Cook) the Quran is

God's uncreated word however it is written or recited, whether it be in heaven or on earth, whether written on the 'guarded tablet' or on the tablets of schoolboys, whether inscribed on stone or on paper, whether memorized in the heart or spoken on the tongue; whoever says otherwise is an infidel whose blood may be shed and from whom God has dissociated Himself.

12th century Almoravid jurist Qadi Iyad, citing the work of Malik ibn Anas, wrote:

He said about someone who said that the Quran is created, "He is an unbeliever, so kill him." He said in the version of Ibn Nafi', "He should be flogged and painfully beaten and imprisoned until he repents." In the version of Bishr ibn Bakr at-Tinnisi we find, "He is killed and his repentance is not accepted."

== Arguments and implications ==
=== Sunni ===
Sunnis believe that the Qur'an is the uncreated word of God. Considering a part of the Qur'anic verse 7:54:

To him belongs the creation and the Command

The exegetes have suggested that this verse underlines the separation between God's creation and His command, therefore the Qur'an was not created.

In fact, fatwas have been given by Imams Ahmad bin Hanbal, Sufyan al-Thawri, Malik ibn Anas, Sufyan ibn ʽUyaynah, and Yahya ibn Ma'in that the one who believes otherwise is a disbeliever of Islam.

=== Shia ===
Ahlul Bayt Digital Islamic Library Project, which collects Shia scholarly works, cites ibn Babawayh (c. 923–991) as disagreeing with Sunnis on the issue of the Quran's createdness because God's attributes of doing (creating, giving sustenance, etc.) cannot be eternal since they require objects to do actions to. For this to be true, "we will have to admit that the world has always existed. But it is against our belief that nothing except God is Eternal." Author Allamah Sayyid Sa'eed Akhtar Rizvi goes on to say that Sunni scholars' failure to make this distinction and insistence that "all His attributes are Eternal" is the cause of their belief that "the kalam (speech) of God, is Eternal, not created". Akhtar Rizvi states:

But as we, the Shi'ah Ithna ‘asharis, distinguish between His personal virtues and His actions, we say: [quoting Ibn Babawayh] "Our belief about the Qur'an is that it is the speech of God. It has been sent by Him – it is His revelation, His book and His word. God is its Creator, Sender and Guardian..."

However, the site quotes Abu al-Qasim Khoei (1899–1992), a marja', in his Al-Bayan fi Tafsir al-Qur’an, the Prolegomena to the Qur’an, declaring that "the question of whether the Qur'an was created or eternal is an extraneous matter that has no connection with the Islamic doctrine", and blames the intrusion of the ideas of alien "Greek philosophy" into the Muslim community for dividing the Ummah "into factions which accused each other of disbelief".

=== Muʿtazilah ===
The adherents of the Muʿtazili school, known as Muʿtazilites, are best known for rejecting the doctrine of the Quran as uncreated and co-eternal with God, asserting that if the Quran is the word of God, he logically "must have preceded his own speech".

Based on Q.2:106 some Muʿtazilah also argued that if the Quran could be subjected to abrogation, with a new verse abrogating an earlier one, it could not be eternal. Other Muʿtazilah however denied the theory of abrogation and did not believe any verse of the Quran was abrogated.

=== Implications ===
Malise Ruthven argues that believers in an uncreated, and thus eternal and unchanging, Quran also argued for predestination of the afterlife of mortals. The two ideas are associated with each other (according to Rwekaza Sympho Mukandala) because if there is predestination (if all events including the afterlife of all humans has been willed by God) then God "in His omnipotence and omniscience must have willed and known about" events related in the Quran.

Believers in a created Quran emphasize free will given to mortals who would be rewarded or punished according to what they chose in life on judgement day. Advocates of the "created" Quran emphasized the references to an 'Arabic' Quran which occur in the divine text, noting that if the Quran was uncreated it was—like God—an eternal being. This gave it (they argued) a status similar to God, constituting a form of bi-theism or shirk.

Rémi Brague argues that while a created Quran may be interpreted "in the juridical sense of the word", an uncreated Quran can only be applied—the application being susceptible only "to grammatical explication (tasfir) and mystical elucidation (ta'wil)"—not interpreted.

== Ahmad ibn Hanbal and the Mihna (ordeal) ==
=== Ahmad ibn Hanbal ===
In standing up for his beliefs, Sunni scholar and muhaddith ibn Hanbal refused to engage in kalam during his interrogation. He was willing to argue only on the basis of the Quran or the traditions and their literal meaning. While this distinction itself is difficult to make in practice, its value is in part rhetorical, for the assertion marks his identity as one who stands by the absolute authority of the sacred texts over-above those who make use of reason. The role of Ahmad ibn Hanbal in the mihna ordeal garnered significant attention in the later historiography of Sunni Islam. Walter Patton (in Aḥmad Ibn Ḥanbal and the Miḥna) presents him as a stalwart of belief, claimed that he did more than any other to strengthen the position of “orthodoxy”.

=== The Mihna ===
Scholars do not agree on why caliph al-Ma'mun acted as he did. Walter Patton, for instance, claims that while partisans might have made political capital out of the public adoption of the doctrine, al-Ma'mun's intention was "primarily to effect a religious reform." Nawas, on the other hand, argues that the doctrine of createdness was a "pseudo-issue", insisting that its promulgation was unlikely an end in itself since the primary sources attached so little significance to its declaration.

The test of the mihna was applied neither universally nor arbitrarily. In fact, the letter that Al-Ma'mun sent to his lieutenant in Baghdad instituting the mihna stipulated that the test be administered to qadis and traditionists (muhaddithin). Both of these groups regard hadith as central to Quranic interpretation and to matters of Islamic jurisprudence. In particular, the rhetorical force of muhaddithin acceptance of the doctrine is then to concede that either or both of the Quran and the hadith corpus attest to the doctrine, simultaneously validating the caliph's theological position and legitimizing his claim to hermeneutical authority with regard to the sacred texts.

== Significance of hadith ==
That the question of the createdness of the Quran is, among other things, a hermeneutical issue is reflected in the variety of arguments and issues that associate with it—whether the Quran or the traditions assert the Quran's createdness, what "created" means, and whether and how this affects the standing of these texts as authoritative and as a consequence, the status of those who study them. Where the Quran is understood as the word of God, and the words and example of the Prophet transmitted through hadith also attain divine significance, if the Quran cannot be taken to assert its own createdness, for the doctrine of createdness to be true the traditions would have to support it. Indeed, to admit the insufficiency of the hadith corpus to adjudicate what with the institution of the mihna becomes such a visible dispute would necessarily marginalize the authority of traditions. Thus it is not by accident that al-Ma'mun decides to administer the test on religious scholars.

== See also ==
- Heavenly Quran
- Quranism
- Biblical literalism
- Bibliolatry
- Exegesis
- History of Islam
- Ibn Kullab
- Islamic schools and branches
- Palermo Quran
- Shirk (Islam)
- Tafsir
- Sufficiency of scripture
