= Mihna =

Period of religious persecution instituted by the 'Abbasid Caliph al-Ma'mun

Map of the Mihna and events associated with it

The Mihna (Arabic: محنة خلق القرآن, romanized: miḥna khalq al-qurʾān, lit. 'ordeal of Quranic createdness') was a period of religious persecution instituted by the Abbasid caliph al-Ma'mun in 833 in which Sunni scholars were punished, imprisoned, or even killed unless they conformed to Mu'tazilite doctrine. The policy lasted for eighteen years (833–851) as it continued through the reigns of al-Ma'mun's immediate successors, al-Mu'tasim and al-Wathiq, until al-Mutawakkil reversed it in 847 and completely banned around 851.

The abolition of Mihna is significant both as the end of the Abbasid Caliph's pretension to decide matters of religious orthodoxy, and as one of the few instances of religious persecution among fellow Muslims in Medieval Islam.

== Beginning and background of Mihna ==
In 827, the caliph al-Ma’mun issued the proclamation of the doctrine of Quranic createdness. The proclamation was followed by the institution of the Mihna six years later, approximately four months before his sudden death in 833. The Mihna continued under his successors, al-Mu’tasim and al-Wathiq, before al-Mutawakkil abolished it between 848 and 851. This particular doctrine was well known to be embraced by the Mu'tazilite school during this period. Muʿtazilites believed that good and evil were not always determined by revealed scripture or interpretation of scripture, but they were rational categories that could be established through unaided reason.

Traditional scholarship viewed the proclamation of doctrine and the Mihna where al-Ma’mun tested the beliefs of his subordinates as linked events, whereby the caliph exercised his religious authority in defining orthodoxy, and enforced his views upon others through his coercive powers as ruler. Al-Ma’mun's motivations for imposing his beliefs upon the members of his government (such as his judges, for the scope of the Mihna was not extended to examining the beliefs of the commoners in the manner of the European Inquisitions) were attributed to his Mu'tazilite intellectual tendencies, his sympathies towards Shia Islam, or a shrewd decision to consolidate his religious authority during a time where the ulama were starting to be seen as the true guardians of religious knowledge and the Prophet's traditions.

=== Background ===
==== Al-Ma’mun and Mu’tazilism ====
Scholars who ascribe the Mihna to al-Ma'mun’s Mu'tazilite persuasion point to his close association with leading Mu’tazilites of the era. Among the Mu’tazilites al-Ma’mun appointed to high positions within his administration include Ahmed ibn Abi Du’ad, a prominent Mu’tazilite who became Chief Qadi during his rule. Due to Ibn Abi Du’ad's background as a Kalam scholar and his rigorous advocacy of the Mihna under the subsequent two caliphs, some scholars have concluded that his influence led to al-Ma’mun finally taking action and implementing the Mihna during the last year of his life. However it remains unclear whether the appointment of Ibn Abi Du’ad is a cause or reflection of al-Ma’mun's plans to institute the Mihna.

==== Al-Ma’mun's Pro-Shi’ite Tendencies ====
More so than other caliphs, Al-Ma’mun demonstrated a closeness with members of the Alid family and some of their doctrines, leading some scholars to suggest that he may have adopted some of their views. A distinguished religious scholar himself, al-Ma’mun's letters to his prefects to initiate the inquisition seem to convey the notion that his knowledge and learning was at a higher level than that of the public or even other religious scholars, who were likened to the vulgar mob who have no insight or illumination on matters pertaining to God. This view is similar to the Shi’i belief that the Imam alone held the esoteric knowledge regarding the Qur'an and matters of faith. In addition to adopting the title of imam, Al-Ma’mun extended special conciliatory gestures to the family of Alids, as evident in his designation of ‘Ali al-Rida as his heir and the special reverence he held for ‘Ali that he also made into a doctrine. Shi’ism, like Mu’tazilism, embraced the doctrine of the createdness of the Qur'an, therefore some scholars construe al-Ma’mun's declaration of this doctrine and the Mihna as reflections of his partiality to Shi’ite doctrines, whereas suggesting that al-Mutawakkil's revocation of the edict was in part rooted in his antagonism towards the Alids.

However, this depiction of using the createdness of Qur'an as a litmus test for Mu’tazilism or Shi’ism can be misleading. While there is an overlap between the two schools of thought on this question, Mu’tazilism and Shi’ism were not the only theological currents to subscribe to this belief, therefore there may not necessarily be a link between the two in the event of al-Ma’mun's Mihna. Furthermore, it is inconclusive whether Shi’ism during this period had fully embraced the notion of the createdness of the Qur'an, or whether it is a retrojection from later times after Sunni and Shi’ism had developed its doctrines. While some scholars argue that the prevailing view among Shi’ite theologians at this time followed the teachings of Ja’far as-Sadiq, who believed in its uncreatedness, other sources challenge whether Imam Ja’far as-Sadiq held such a view.

==== Mihna as an Assertion of caliphal Authority ====
Some of the more recent scholarship on the Mihna suggests that al-Ma’mun may have used it as an opportunity to reassert his religious authority as Caliph. In a series of letters to his governors, al-Ma’mun's elaborated on the caliph's role as the guardian of God's religion and laws. He appeared to draw upon the Shi’ite notion that the caliph-imam alone possessed esoteric knowledge, and used this to emphasis his role as an educator to lead the people out of ignorance in religious matters. Al-Ma’mun's Mihna appeared to be an effort to wrestle authority over religious knowledge from the scholars (‘ulama), notably from traditionalists such as Ahmed ibn Hanbal whose authority to interpret the religion was rooted in their expertise in the Prophet's traditions. However, in the longer trend of pre-modern Islamic history, religious authority would become the exclusive purview of the scholars, while the caliph was reduced first to a political authority, and gradually to a symbolic entity. This explanation for the Mihna is the position taken up by most modern scholars.

== Under the two Abbasid caliphs ==
=== Under al-Mu'tasim ===
Al-Ma'mun died in 833, but his policy was continued by al-Mu'tasim. In that same year the famous religious scholar Ahmad ibn Hanbal was put to the question, to which he answered that the Qu'ran was uncreated. Al-Mu'tasim removed him from his post, imprisoned him, and had him flogged until he was unconscious. However, the people of Baghdad threatened to riot at the news of ibn Hanbal's arrest, and al-Mu'tasim had him released. al-Mu'tasim was afterwards preoccupied with the construction of the new capital at Samarra and with military campaigns, and did not pursue the Mihna as anything more than a courtroom formality (the testimony of a person who answered in the negative was inadmissible in court.)

=== Under al-Wathiq ===
Like his father al-Muta'sim, al-Wathiq was an ardent Mu'tazilite—the sources agree that he was strongly influenced by the chief qadi, Ibn Abi Duwad—but also, like his father, maintained good relations with the Alids. In the third year of his caliphate, al-Wathiq revived the inquisition (mihna), sending officials to question jurists on their views on the controversial topic of the createdness of the Quran.

=== Ban of al-Mutawakkil ===
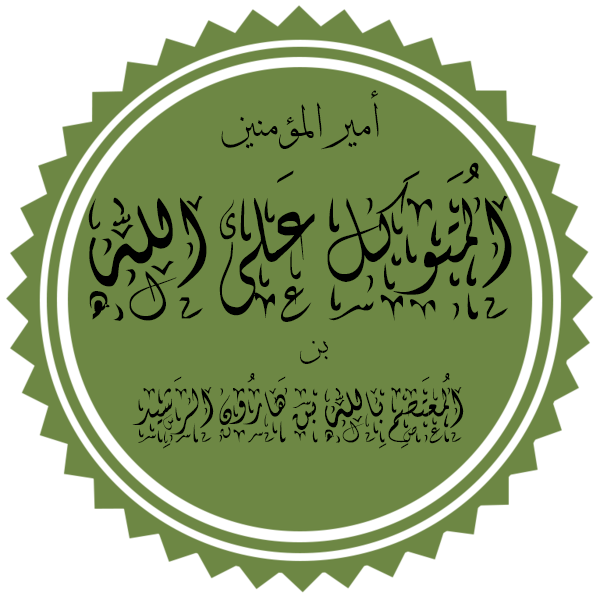
Islamic Calligraphic representation of Al-Mutawakkil's name, who is considered a righteous ruler in the 9th century.

Al-Mutawakkil decided to diverge away from the religious policies of the previous caliphs, opting instead to put a stop to the controversy over whether the Qur'an was created or uncreated, ultimately bringing an end to the doctrinal regime that had been in place since 833. Al-Mutawakkil spent the next several years taking hostile steps against the Mu'tazilites, dismissing a number of Ibn Abi Du'ad's qadis from office and ordering an end to debate over the nature of the Qur'an. Al-Mutawakkil abandoned it in 847 and banned around 851.

== Aftermath ==
In classical Islam, it was private individuals and not the caliphate who undertook the mission of developing the various Islamic sciences including the law. That is, the law, contrary to what happens in modern nation states, was not the exclusive preserve of the state. In fact, the jurists developed it in conscious opposition to the state (e.g., Jackson, 2002). From early on, there was a religious order in classical Islam that was distinct from the political order. The semi-autonomy of the scholars resulted in the interesting phenomenon of the emergence of different, and regarding some issues, diametrically opposed schools of jurisprudence—all considered Islamically valid and authentic. The Mihna, within this context, reflects the caliph's frustration with the powerful and influential juristic culture. It lasted about fifteen years, after which the domains of authority of both the political and religious orders became more well-defined. This does not mean that confrontation was the hallmark of the relationship between both orders. The relationship was more nuanced and involved not only confrontation but also collaboration. Generally speaking, the religious order stood as a buffer between the political order and the common people.

The rise of literal interpretation and the centrality of the Sunnah

The literal interpretation of the Qur’an was adopted in theological matters as the basis. The Sunnah (the reliable actions and sayings of the Prophet Muhammad) was given a divine and sacred nature and an important legislative source, in addition to marginalizing opinion and relying on the statements of ancient scholars in resolving theological disputes.

== Sources ==
- Turner, John P. (2010). "The End of the Mihna". Oriens. 38: 89–106. doi:10.1163/187783710X536671.
- Melchert, Christopher (1996). "Religious Policies of the Caliphs from al-Mutawakkil to al-Muqtadir: AH 232-295/AD 847–908". Islamic Law and Society. 3 (3): 316–342. doi:10.1163/1568519962599069. JSTOR 3399413.
- Ibn Khallikan, Shams al-Din Abu al-Abbas Ahmad ibn Muhammad (1871). Ibn Khallikan's Biographical Dictionary, Vol. I. Trans. Bn. Mac Guckin de Slane. Paris: Oriental Translation Fund of Great Britain and Ireland.
- Yarshater, Ehsan, ed. (1985–2007). The History of al-Ṭabarī (40 vols). SUNY Series in Near Eastern Studies. Albany, New York: State University of New York Press. ISBN 978-0-7914-7249-1.
- Kraemer, Joel L., ed. (1989). The History of al-Ṭabarī, Volume XXXIV: Incipient Decline: The Caliphates of al-Wāthiq, al-Mutawakkil and al-Muntaṣir, A.D. 841–863/A.H. 227–248. SUNY Series in Near Eastern Studies. Albany, New York: State University of New York Press. ISBN 978-0-88706-874-4.
- Turner, John P. (2013). "The Enigmatic Reign of al-Wāthiq (r. 227/842-232/847)". In Bernards, Monique (ed.). ʿAbbāsid Studies IV. Occasional Papers of the School of ʿAbbāsid Studies, Leuven, July 5 – July 9, 2010. Gibb Memorial Trust. pp. 218–231. ISBN 978-0-906094-98-3.
- Zetterstéen, K. V.; Bosworth, C. E. & van Donzel, E. (2002). "al-Wāt̲h̲iḳ Bi 'llāh". In Bearman, P. J.; Bianquis, Th.; Bosworth, C. E.; van Donzel, E. & Heinrichs, W. P. (eds.). The Encyclopaedia of Islam, Second Edition. Volume XI: W–Z. Leiden: E. J. Brill. p. 178. doi:10.1163/1573-3912_islam_SIM_7894. ISBN 978-90-04-12756-2.
- Kan, Kadir (2012). "Vâsiḳ-Billâh". TDV Encyclopedia of Islam, Vol. 42 (Tütün – Vehran) (in Turkish). Istanbul: Presidency of Religious Affairs, Centre for Islamic Studies. pp. 548–549. ISBN 978-975-389-737-2.
- Cooperson, Michael (2005). Al-Ma'mun (Makers of the Muslim World). Oxford, England: Oneworld Publications. ISBN 978-1-85168-386-4.
- Ess, J. V. (2006). The Flowering of Muslim Theology. USA: Harvard University Press. ISBN 978-0-674-02208-9.
- Hurvitz, N. (2001). "Mihna as Self-Defense". Studia Islamica. 92 (92): 93–111. doi:10.2307/1596192. JSTOR 1596192.
- Jackson, S. A. (2002). "Jihad and the Modern World". Journal of Islamic Law and Culture. 7 (1): 1–26.
- Nawas, J. A. (1994). "A Rexamination of Three Current Explanations for al-Ma'mun's Introduction of the Mihna". International Journal of Middle East Studies. 26 (4): 615–629. doi:10.1017/S0020743800061134. S2CID 159973328.
- Nawas, J. A. (1996). "The Mihna of 218 A.H./833 A. D. Revisited: An Empirical Study". Journal of the American Oriental Society. 116 (4). Journal of the American Oriental Society, Vol. 116, No. 4: 698–708. doi:10.2307/605440. JSTOR 605440.
